= List of craters in the Solar System =

This is a list of officially named craters in the Solar System as named by IAU's Working Group for Planetary System Nomenclature. As of 2017, there is a total of 5,223 craters on 40 astronomical bodies, which includes minor planets (asteroids and dwarf planets), planets, and natural satellites. All geological features of a body (including craters) are typically named after a specific theme. For completeness, the list also refers to the craters on § Earth, which naming process is not overseen by IAU's WGPSN.

- lunar: 1,624 craters (31.2%)
- Martian: 1,092 craters (21.0%)
- Venerian: 900 craters (17.3%)
- Mercurian: 397 craters (7.6%)
- Others: 1,198 craters (23.0%)
Distribution of named craters in the Solar System as of 2017.

== Amalthea (2) ==
| Feature | Diameter | Approval Year | Eponym | Ref |
|---|---|---|---|---|
| Gaea | 80 km | 1979 | Gaia, Greek mother earth goddess who brought Zeus to Crete | WGPSN |
| Pan | 100 km | 1979 | Pan, Greek goat-god son of Amalthea and Hermes | WGPSN |

== Ariel (17) ==
| Crater | Coordinates | Diameter (km) | Approval Year | Eponym | Ref |
|---|---|---|---|---|---|
| Abans | 15.5°S 108.7°W | 20 | 1988 | Spirit of the iron mines | WGPSN |
| Agape | 46.9°S 23.5°W | 34 | 1988 | Spirit in Spenser's Fairy Queene | WGPSN |
| Ataksak | 53.1°S 135.7°W | 22 | 1988 | Eskimo benevolent spirit | WGPSN |
| Befana | 17°S 31.9°E | 21 | 1988 | Good spirit who fills Italian children's stockings with toys on twelfth night | WGPSN |
| Berylune | 22.5°S 32.1°W | 29 | 1988 | Good spirit in Maeterlinck's The Bluebird | WGPSN |
| Deive | 22.3°S 23°E | 20 | 1988 | Spirit of beautiful maiden | WGPSN |
| Djadek | 12°S 108.9°W | 22 | 1988 | Czech ancestral benevolent spirit and household guardian | WGPSN |
| Domovoy | 71.5°S 20.3°W | 71 | 1988 | Slavic spirit protector of home | WGPSN |
| Finvara | 15.8°S 19°E | 31 | 1988 | Irish king of spirits; provided horses and wine to men | WGPSN |
| Gwyn | 77.5°S 22.5°E | 34 | 1988 | Irish god of battle; leads men's souls to Annwn | WGPSN |
| Huon | 37.8°S 33.7°E | 40 | 1988 | Replaced Oberon as King of Spirits when Oberon died | WGPSN |
| Laica | 21.3°S 44.4°E | 30 | 1988 | Inca good spirit | WGPSN |
| Mab | 38.8°S 7.8°W | 34 | 1988 | Queen of Spirits dethroned Titania | WGPSN |
| Melusine | 52.9°S 8.9°E | 50 | 1988 | Spirit heroine of medieval French story | WGPSN |
| Oonagh | 21.9°S 115.6°W | 39 | 1988 | Irish Queen of Fairies | WGPSN |
| Rima | 18.3°S 99.2°W | 41 | 1988 | Spirit in Hudson's Green Mansions | WGPSN |
| Yangoor | 68.7°S 80.3°W | 78 | 1988 | Spirit that brings day | WGPSN |

back to top

== Arrokoth (1) ==
| Crater | Coordinates | Diameter (km) | Approval Year | Eponym | Ref |
|---|---|---|---|---|---|
| Sky | – | 6.8 | 2021 | The English word "sky" | WGPSN |

back to top

== Callisto (141) ==
| Crater | Coordinates | Diameter (km) | Approval Year | Eponym | Ref |
|---|---|---|---|---|---|
| Adal | 75.5°N 79.7°W | 41.7 | 1979 | Adal (Norse) | WGPSN |
| Aegir | 45.8°S 103.8°W | 53.9 | 1997 | Aegir (Norse) | WGPSN |
| Agloolik | 47.7°S 82.4°W | 61.6 | 1997 | Agloolik (Inuit) | WGPSN |
| Ägröi | 43.2°N 10.9°W | 67.4 | 1979 | Äkräs (Uralic) | WGPSN |
| Ahti | 41.4°N 102.4°W | 54.8 | 1988 | Ahti (Finnish) | WGPSN |
| Ajleke | 22.7°N 101.4°W | 70 | 1988 | Ajleke (Sami) | WGPSN |
| Akycha | 72.6°N 41.3°E | 81 | 1979 | Akycha (Inuit of Alaska) | WGPSN |
| Alfr | 9.9°S 137.3°E | 96 | 1979 | Alfr (Norse) | WGPSN |
| Áli | 59°N 55.9°W | 32.9 | 1979 | Áli (Norse) | WGPSN |
| Ánarr | 44°N 0.5°W | 41.7 | 1979 | Ánarr (Norse) | WGPSN |
| Arcas | 85.6°S 67.5°W | 60.9 | 1997 | Arcas (Greek) | WGPSN |
| Askr | 51.8°N 35.9°E | 68.8 | 1979 | Askr (Norse) | WGPSN |
| Audr | 30.9°S 80.6°W | 80.8 | 1997 | Audr (Norse) | WGPSN |
| Austri | 80.9°S 64.5°W | 15 | 1997 | Austri (Norse) | WGPSN |
| Aziren | 35.4°N 178.2°W | 55.6 | 1988 | Aziren (Estonian) | WGPSN |
| Balkr | 28.9°N 11.7°W | 68 | 1979 | Balkr (Norse) | WGPSN |
| Barri | 31.5°S 70.5°W | 69 | 1997 | Barri (Norse) | WGPSN |
| Bavörr | 49.1°N 20°W | 85.3 | 1979 | Bavörr (Norse) | WGPSN |
| Beli | 62.6°N 80.2°W | 55.6 | 1979 | Belenus (Celtic) | WGPSN |
| Biflindi | 53.6°S 74.1°W | 58 | 1997 | Biflindi (Norse) | WGPSN |
| Bragi | 75.5°N 60.7°W | 61.8 | 1979 | Bragi (Norse) | WGPSN |
| Brami | 28.8°N 19°W | 75.7 | 1979 | Brami (Norse) | WGPSN |
| Bran | 24.2°S 154.4°E | 78 | 1979 | Bran the Blessed (Celtic) | WGPSN |
| Buga | 22.3°N 36.1°E | 59 | 1979 | Buga (god) (Evenk) | WGPSN |
| Buri | 37.5°S 45.5°W | 86 | 1979 | Búri (Norse) | WGPSN |
| Burr | 42.7°N 134.5°W | 75.4 | 1979 | Burr (Norse) | WGPSN |
| Dag | 58.5°N 73.3°W | 46.6 | 1979 | Dag (Norse) | WGPSN |
| Danr | 62.5°N 76.9°W | 45.2 | 1979 | Danr (Norse) | WGPSN |
| Dia | 73°N 50.5°W | 34.4 | 1979 | Dia (Greek) | WGPSN |
| Doh | 30.6°N 141.4°W | 59.5 | 1997 | Doh (Ketian) | WGPSN |
| Dryops | 80°N 34.8°W | 31.5 | 1979 | Dryops (Greek; son of Apollo) | WGPSN |
| Durinn | 67°N 89.1°W | 51.6 | 1979 | Durin (Norse) | WGPSN |
| Egdir | 33.9°N 35.9°W | 60.6 | 1979 | Eggthér (Norse) | WGPSN |
| Egres | 42.5°N 176.6°W | 45.5 | 1988 | Äkräs (Karelian) | WGPSN |
| Erlik | 66.8°N 1.3°W | 26.6 | 1979 | Erlik (Russian) | WGPSN |
| Fadir | 56.6°N 12.6°W | 78.6 | 1979 | Fadir (Norse) | WGPSN |
| Fili | 64.2°N 10.3°E | 31.7 | 1979 | Fili (Norse) | WGPSN |
| Finnr | 15.5°N 4.3°W | 80 | 1979 | Finnr (Norse) | WGPSN |
| Freki | 79.8°N 8.3°E | 55 | 1979 | Freki (Norse) | WGPSN |
| Frodi | 68.4°N 139.9°W | 45.9 | 1979 | Frodi (Norse) | WGPSN |
| Fulla | 74°N 108.1°W | 58.9 | 1979 | Fulla (Norse) | WGPSN |
| Fulnir | 60.1°N 35.3°W | 43.1 | 1979 | Fulnir (Norse) | WGPSN |
| Gandalfr | 80.5°S 63.6°W | 17 | 1997 | Gandalfr (Norse) | WGPSN |
| Geri | 66.7°N 6.2°E | 38.9 | 1979 | Geri (Norse) | WGPSN |
| Ginandi | 85.3°S 52.1°W | 44.4 | 1997 | Ginandi (Norse) | WGPSN |
| Gisl | 57.2°N 34.6°W | 37 | 1979 | Gisl (Norse) | WGPSN |
| Gloi | 49°N 115°E | 115.3 | 1979 | Gloi (Norse) | WGPSN |
| Göll | 57.3°N 40.3°E | 55.4 | 1979 | Göll (Norse) | WGPSN |
| Göndul | 60°N 114.1°W | 45.5 | 1979 | Göndul (Norse) | WGPSN |
| Grimr | 41.5°N 145.4°E | 103.2 | 1979 | Grimr (Norse) | WGPSN |
| Gunnr | 64.6°N 104.7°W | 61.1 | 1979 | Gunnr (Norse) | WGPSN |
| Gymir | 63.7°N 48.8°W | 40.6 | 1979 | Gymir (Norse) | WGPSN |
| Hábrok | 76.2°N 131.9°W | 37.2 | 1979 | Hábrók (Norse) | WGPSN |
| Haki | 25°N 44.9°E | 72.2 | 1979 | Haki (Norse) | WGPSN |
| Hár | 3.5°S 2°E | 52.2 | 1979 | Hár (Norse) | WGPSN |
| Heimdall | 63.5°S 3°E | 210 | 2000 | Heimdall (Norse) | WGPSN |
| Hepti | 64.5°N 23.4°W | 48.6 | 1979 | Hepti (Norse) | WGPSN |
| Hijsi | 63.1°N 171.5°W | 54.1 | 1988 | Hiisi (Karelian) | WGPSN |
| Hödr | 69.1°N 89.2°W | 76.5 | 1979 | Hödr (Norse) | WGPSN |
| Hoenir | 33.7°S 99.1°E | 81.1 | 1979 | Hoenir (Norse) | WGPSN |
| Högni | 11.8°S 4.8°W | 76 | 1979 | Högni (Norse) | WGPSN |
| Höldr | 43.9°N 108.2°W | 68.1 | 1988 | Höldr (Norse) | WGPSN |
| Igaluk | 5.6°N 44°E | 111.7 | 1979 | Igaluk (Alaskan Inuit) | WGPSN |
| Ilma | 29.9°S 167.2°W | 102 | 1988 | Ilma (not specified) | WGPSN |
| Ivarr | 5.8°S 38.6°E | 73.1 | 1979 | Ivarr (Norse) | WGPSN |
| Jalkr | 38.6°S 82.7°W | 93.5 | 1997 | Jalkr (Norse) | WGPSN |
| Jumal | 58.9°N 118°W | 58.5 | 1988 | Jumal (Estonian) | WGPSN |
| Jumo | 65.7°N 11.8°W | 43.6 | 1979 | Jumo (Uralic) | WGPSN |
| Kári | 48.2°N 116.3°W | 34.5 | 1979 | Kári (Norse) | WGPSN |
| Karl | 56.4°N 29.4°E | 34 | 1979 | Karl (Norse) | WGPSN |
| Keelut | 76.8°S 90.9°W | 64 | 1997 | Keelut (Inuit) | WGPSN |
| Kul' | 62.9°N 121.9°W | 40.5 | 1988 | Kul' (Komi) | WGPSN |
| Lempo | 25.2°S 40.1°E | 41.3 | 1988 | Lempo (Uralic) | WGPSN |
| Ljekio | 49.1°N 162.3°W | 23.8 | 1988 | Liekkiö (Finnish) | WGPSN |
| Lodurr | 50.8°S 89.9°E | 72 | 1979 | Lóðurr (Norse) | WGPSN |
| Lofn | 56.5°S 22.3°W | 200 | 1997 | Lofn (Norse) | WGPSN |
| Loni | 3.6°S 145.7°E | 85 | 1979 | Loni (Norse) | WGPSN |
| Losy | 65.3°N 36.7°E | 62.1 | 1979 | Losy (Mongol) | WGPSN |
| Lycaon | 45.4°S 5.9°W | 59 | 1997 | Lycaon (Greek) | WGPSN |
| Maderatcha | 30.7°N 95.3°W | 66.2 | 1988 | Máttaráhkká (Sámi) | WGPSN |
| Mera | 64.1°N 75.2°W | 39.5 | 1979 | Mera (Greek) | WGPSN |
| Mimir | 32.6°N 53.2°W | 47.7 | 1979 | Mimir (Norse) | WGPSN |
| Mitsina | 57.5°N 103.7°W | 40.4 | 1979 | Mitsina (Alaskan Inuit) | WGPSN |
| Modi | 66.4°N 119.3°W | 37.8 | 1979 | Modi (Norse) | WGPSN |
| Nakki | 56.4°S 69.7°W | 59.8 | 1997 | Näkki (Finnish) | WGPSN |
| Nama | 57°N 29°E | 30.1 | 1979 | Nama (? folklore) | WGPSN |
| Nár | 1.5°S 46°W | 56.9 | 1979 | Nár (Norse) | WGPSN |
| Nerrivik | 16.9°S 56.4°W | 44.3 | 1979 | Nerrivik (Alaskan Inuit) | WGPSN |
| Nidi | 66.4°N 94.9°W | 49.3 | 1979 | Niði (Norse) | WGPSN |
| Nirkes | 31.4°N 164.3°W | 58.5 | 1988 | Nyyrikki (Karelian) | WGPSN |
| Njord | 16.7°N 132.6°W | 44.6 | 1988 | Njord (Norse) | WGPSN |
| Nori | 45.2°N 16.4°E | 114 | 1979 | Nori (Norse) | WGPSN |
| Norov-Ava | 54.6°N 112.8°W | 41.4 | 1988 | Norov-Ava (Mordvinian) | WGPSN |
| Nuada | 62.3°N 87.5°E | 66 | 1979 | Nuada (Celtic) | WGPSN |
| Numi-Torum | 50.1°S 92.9°W | 75.6 | 1997 | Numi-Torum (Mansi people of Russia) | WGPSN |
| Nyctimus | 62.8°S 3.9°W | 34 | 1997 | Nyctimus (Greek) | WGPSN |
| Oluksak | 47.8°S 63.5°W | 86.7 | 1997 | Oluksak (Celtic) | WGPSN |
| Omol' | 42.3°N 116.9°W | 60.4 | 1988 | Omol' (Komi) | WGPSN |
| Orestheus | 46.7°S 47.7°W | 22.5 | 1997 | Orestheus (Greek) | WGPSN |
| Oski | 57.5°N 91°E | 48.1 | 1979 | Oski (Norse) | WGPSN |
| Ottar | 61.5°N 103.9°W | 59.8 | 1979 | Ottar (Norse) | WGPSN |
| Pekko | 18.3°N 5.4°W | 62 | 1979 | Pekko (Uralic) | WGPSN |
| Randver | 71.9°S 53.9°W | 28 | 1997 | Randver (Norse) | WGPSN |
| Reginleif | 66°S 96.5°W | 54.8 | 1997 | Regincleif (Norse) | WGPSN |
| Reginn | 39.8°N 90.1°W | 57 | 1979 | Reginn (Norse) | WGPSN |
| Reifnir | 50.8°S 54.3°W | 36.8 | 1997 | Reifnir (Norse) | WGPSN |
| Rigr | 70.8°N 115.4°E | 72.5 | 1979 | Rigr (Norse) | WGPSN |
| Rongoteus | 53.6°N 106.1°W | 35.5 | 1988 | Rongoteus (Karelian) | WGPSN |
| Rota | 27.2°N 108.4°W | 45 | 1988 | Róta (Norse) | WGPSN |
| Saga | 0.6°N 34.1°E | 11.1 | 1979 | Saga (Norse) | WGPSN |
| Sarakka | 3.3°S 53.5°W | 47.7 | 1979 | Sáráhkká (Sámi | WGPSN |
| Seqinek | 55.5°N 25.4°W | 80.7 | 1979 | Seqinek (Inuit) | WGPSN |
| Sholmo | 53.7°N 16.2°W | 57 | 1979 | Sholmo (Uralic) | WGPSN |
| Sigyn | 35.9°N 29°W | 49.8 | 1979 | Sigyn (Norse) | WGPSN |
| Skeggold | 49.7°S 31.9°W | 43 | 1997 | Skeggöld (Norse) | WGPSN |
| Sköll | 55.6°N 44.4°E | 59.6 | 1979 | Sköll (Norse) | WGPSN |
| Skuld | 10°N 37.9°W | 91.8 | 1979 | Skuld (Norse) | WGPSN |
| Sudri | 55.9°N 135.6°W | 69.5 | 1979 | Sudri (Norse) | WGPSN |
| Sumbur | 67.1°N 34.8°E | 37.9 | 1979 | Sumbur (Buryat) | WGPSN |
| Tapio | 30.1°N 108.6°W | 52.2 | 1988 | Tapio (Finnish) | WGPSN |
| Thekkr | 80.3°S 62°W | 13 | 1997 | Thekkr (Norse) | WGPSN |
| Thorir | 31.9°S 66.7°W | 62.7 | 1997 | Thorir (Norse) | WGPSN |
| Tindr | 2.3°S 4.5°E | 75.8 | 1979 | Tindr (Norse) | WGPSN |
| Tontu | 27.6°N 100.3°W | 40.2 | 1988 | Tonttu (Finnish) | WGPSN |
| Tornarsuk | 28.8°N 127.6°W | 99 | 1979 | Tornarsuk (Greenland Inuit) | WGPSN |
| Tyll | 44.8°N 166.5°W | 68.7 | 1988 | Suur Tõll (Estonian) | WGPSN |
| Tyn | 71.1°N 127.5°E | 63 | 1979 | Tyn (Germanic) | WGPSN |
| Uksakka | 49.5°S 42.2°W | 22.5 | 1997 | Uksáhkká (Sámi) | WGPSN |
| Valfödr | 1.3°S 113°E | 101.5 | 1979 | Valfödr (Norse) | WGPSN |
| Vali | 9.7°N 34.7°E | 54.3 | 1979 | Vali (Norse) | WGPSN |
| Vanapagan | 39.5°N 158.5°W | 62.7 | 1988 | Vanapagan (Estonian) | WGPSN |
| Veralden | 33.3°N 95.5°W | 75.2 | 1988 | Veralden (Sami religion) | WGPSN |
| Vestri | 45.3°N 52.5°W | 77.3 | 1979 | Vestri (Norse) | WGPSN |
| Vidarr | 12.1°N 166.6°E | 78 | 1988 | Vidarr (Norse) | WGPSN |
| Vitr | 22.1°S 10.6°E | 72.8 | 1979 | Vitr (Norse) | WGPSN |
| Vu-Murt | 21.5°N 170.3°W | 34.5 | 1988 | Vu-Murt (Estonian) | WGPSN |
| Vutash | 31.6°N 102.3°W | 46.2 | 1988 | Vutash (Estonian) | WGPSN |
| Ymir | 51.5°N 99.7°W | 79 | 1979 | Ymir (Norse) | WGPSN |
| Yuryung | 54.7°S 85.7°W | 75.1 | 1997 | Yuryung (Sakha) | WGPSN |

back to top

== Ceres (90) ==
| Crater | Coordinates | Diameter (km) | Approval Year | Eponym | Ref |
|---|---|---|---|---|---|
| Abellio | 33.2°N 66.91°W | 32 | 2015 | Gaul god of the apple tree | WGPSN |
| Achita | 25.82°N 65.96°E | 40 | 2015 | Nigerian god of agriculture | WGPSN |
| Annona | 48.14°S 8.43°E | 60 | 2015 | Roman goddess of crops and of the harvest | WGPSN |
| Anura | 13.92°S 11.79°E | 37 | 2015 | Arawakan (Guyana) spirit of the tobacco seeds | WGPSN |
| Aristaeus | 23.43°N 97.68°E | 35.8 | 2016 | Greek god of agriculture | WGPSN |
| Asari | 83.03°N 40.12°W | 56 | 2015 | Syrian god of agriculture | WGPSN |
| Attis | 73.07°S 102.16°W | 22 | 2015 | Greek/Phrygian god of vegetation and of fertility | WGPSN |
| Azacca | 6.66°S 141.6°W | 49.91 | 2015 | Haitian god of agriculture | WGPSN |
| Begbalel | 17.71°N 34.65°W | 102 | 2016 | Yap Islands (Caroline Islands Micronesia) guardian of the taro fields who controls the yield of the crops | WGPSN |
| Belun | 33.71°S 3.75°W | 36.04 | 2015 | Belarus god of the fields | WGPSN |
| Besua | 42.35°S 59.79°W | 17 | 2015 | Egyptian grain god | WGPSN |
| Bilwis | 86.2°N 79.6°E | 7 | 2017 | German corn spirit | WGPSN |
| Binayo | 86.4°N 145.2°E | 16 | 2017 | Philippine (Hanunoo/Mangyan Mindoro Island) female spirit caretaker of the rice spirits | WGPSN |
| Bonsu | 1.74°N 93.21°E | 31 | 2015 | Bateg/Batek (Malaysia) god who watches over the fruits and flowers | WGPSN |
| Braciaca | 22.77°S 84.37°E | 8 | 2016 | Celtic god of malt | WGPSN |
| Cacaguat | 1.19°S 143.61°E | 13.6 | 2016 | Nicaraguan god of cacao | WGPSN |
| Cachimana | 85.2°N 146.8°W | 18 | 2017 | Atabapo and Inirida tribes’ (Upper Orinoco River region Venezuela) vegetation god who ripens the crops and controls the seasons | WGPSN |
| Centeotl | 18.95°N 141.22°E | 6 | 2016 | Mexican god/goddess of maize and agriculture | WGPSN |
| Chaminuka | 58.58°S 131.2°E | 122 | 2015 | Shona (Zimbabwe) spirit who provides rains in times of droughts | WGPSN |
| Coniraya | 39.9°N 65.73°E | 135 | 2015 | Inca god who was responsible for the system of agricultural terracing and irrigation | WGPSN |
| Consus | 20.7°S 159.5°W | 64 | 2016 | Italian agricultural god who watched over the harvested and stored crop | WGPSN |
| Cozobi | 45.33°N 72.69°W | 24 | 2015 | Zapotec (S. Mexico) god of maize and of abundant food | WGPSN |
| Dada | 58.63°N 23.24°W | 12 | 2015 | Nigerian god of vegetables | WGPSN |
| Dantu | 24.3°N 138.23°E | 126 | 2015 | Ghanan god associated with the planting of the corn | WGPSN |
| Darzamat | 44.21°S 76.4°E | 92 | 2015 | Darzamate Dārza-māte; Latvian spirit "Mother of the garden." | WGPSN |
| Datan | 59.5°N 107.69°W | 60 | 2015 | Polish god of the tilling of the soil | WGPSN |
| Dikhan | 81.8°N 78.1°E | 21 | 2017 | Dikhan baba; Kazakh preislamic deity of farming | WGPSN |
| Doliku | 40.79°S 5.88°E | 15 | 2015 | Dahomey (Benin) god of the fields | WGPSN |
| Duginavi | 39.2°N 4.29°E | 155 | 2016 | Kogi (N. Colombia) god who taught people agriculture | WGPSN |
| Ernutet | 52.93°N 45.52°E | 53.4 | 2015 | Egyptian cobra-headed goddess of the harvest | WGPSN |
| Enzinu | 43.24°N 164.3°W | 116 | 2015 | Sumerian goddess of the grain | WGPSN |
| Fejokoo | 29.15°N 47.89°W | 68 | 2015 | Nigerian god who supplied the yams | WGPSN |
| Fluusa | 31.31°S 178.22°E | 60 | 2015 | Oscan (ancient S. Italy) goddess of flowers counterpart of Roman goddess Flora | WGPSN |
| Gaue | 30.81°N 86.16°E | 80 | 2015 | Germanic goddess to whom offerings are made in harvesting the rye | WGPSN |
| Geshtin | 57°N 101.19°W | 80 | 2015 | Sumerian/Babylonian goddess of the vine | WGPSN |
| Ghanan | 76.56°N 30.76°E | 68 | 2015 | Mayan god of maize | WGPSN |
| Hakumyi | 51.42°N 27.75°E | 29.2 | 2016 | Paraguay Brazil and Bolivia spirit helpful in gardening | WGPSN |
| Hamori | 60.86°S 79.44°E | 60 | 2015 | Japanese god protector of tree leaves | WGPSN |
| Hatipowa | 16.08°S 2.29°W | 40 | 2016 | Indian god of agriculture | WGPSN |
| Haulani | 5.8°N 10.77°E | 34 | 2015 | Hau-lani; Hawaiian plant goddess | WGPSN |
| Heneb | 10.87°N 168.96°W | 39 | 2015 | Egyptian god of grain produce and vineyards | WGPSN |
| Homshuk | 11.23°N 94.06°E | 70 | 2015 | Popoluca (S. Mexico) spirit of corn (maize) | WGPSN |
| Ialonus | 48.15°N 168.53°E | 16.5 | 2016 | British god of the cultivated field and of the meadows | WGPSN |
| Ikapati | 33.84°N 45.61°E | 50 | 2015 | Philippine goddess of the cultivated lands | WGPSN |
| Inamahari | 14.13°N 89.22°E | 68 | 2015 | Catawba (S. Carolina USA) pair of male and female deities invoked for success at the sowing season | WGPSN |
| Insitor | 10.71°S 124.87°E | 26 | 2015 | Roman agricultural deity in charge of the sowing | WGPSN |
| Jaja | 52.09°N 125.27°E | 22 | 2015 | Abkhazian (Transcaucasia) harvest goddess | WGPSN |
| Jarimba | 24.08°S 21.25°E | 69 | 2015 | Arunta/Aranda (Australia) god of flowers and fruit | WGPSN |
| Jarovit | 67.9°N 75.26°W | 66 | 2015 | Slavic god of fertility and harvest who comes down to the Underworld after every harvest and returns to a usual world every spring | WGPSN |
| Juling | 35.9°S 168.48°E | 20 | 2015 | Sakai/Orang Asli (Malaysia) spirit of the crops | WGPSN |
| Kaikara | 42.82°N 137.57°W | 72 | 2015 | Konjo and Banyoro/Nyoro (Uganda) goddess of harvest | WGPSN |
| Kait | 2.1°S 137.57°W | 0.4 | 2015 | Hattic goddess of grain (Asia Minor) | WGPSN |
| Kerwan | 10.77°S 123.99°E | 280 | 2015 | Hopi spirit of the sprouting maize (Arizona SW USA) | WGPSN |
| Kiriamma | 50.32°N 126.33°E | 18.7 | 2016 | Veddan (Sri Lanka) goddess provider of food ("Milk mother") | WGPSN |
| Kirnis | 4.9°N 95.7°W | 115 | 2015 | Lithuanian spirit guardian of cherry trees | WGPSN |
| Kondos | 19.34°S 17.31°E | 44 | 2015 | Finnish agricultural deity | WGPSN |
| Kumitoga | 10.09°S 178.83°E | 96 | 2015 | Polynesian goddess of plant life | WGPSN |
| Kupalo | 39.44°S 173.2°E | 26 | 2015 | Russian god of vegetation and of the harvest | WGPSN |
| Laukumate | 65.03°N 159.42°E | 29.7 | 2016 | Latvian spirit "Mother of the fields." | WGPSN |
| Liber | 42.56°N 37.8°E | 23 | 2015 | Roman god of agriculture | WGPSN |
| Lociyo | 6.53°S 131.17°W | 37.8 | 2016 | Zapotec (Mexico) deity to whom a ceremony is performed when the first chili plant is cut | WGPSN |
| Lono | 36.61°S 55.63°W | 20 | 2015 | Hawaiian god of agriculture | WGPSN |
| Meanderi | 40.8°S 165.81°W | 103 | 2015 | Ngaing (New Guinea) goddess of taro sugar cane and other foods | WGPSN |
| Megwomets | 36.54°N 146.22°E | 78.7 | 2016 | Yurok (California USA) dwarf god of acorns and the distributor of vegetal abundance | WGPSN |
| Messor | 49.93°N 126.27°W | 40 | 2015 | Roman god of harvesting of cutting of the grain | WGPSN |
| Mlezi | 76°N 136.8°W | 41.5 | 2017 | Name of god Tilo as "Food-Giver" (Tonga tribes of Malawi and Zambia) | WGPSN |
| Mondamin | 62.24°S 6°W | 126 | 2015 | Ojibwe /Chippewa corn (maize) god (Lake Superior area Canada and USA) | WGPSN |
| Nawish | 18.28°N 166.21°W | 77 | 2015 | Acoma (New Mexico SW USA) guardian of the field | WGPSN |
| Nepen | 6.19°N 139.46°W | 26.4 | 2016 | Egyptian god of rain | WGPSN |
| Ninsar | 30.3°N 96.74°W | 40 | 2015 | Sumerian goddess of plants and vegetation | WGPSN |
| Occator | 19.82°N 120.67°W | 92 | 2015 | Roman agricultural deity of the harrowing | WGPSN |
| Oltagon | 25.95°S 37.96°E | 28 | 2015 | Philippine agricultural goddess | WGPSN |
| Omonga | 58.03°N 71.67°E | 77 | 2015 | Tomori/Mori (Celebes/Sulawesi Indonesia) rice spirit who dwells in the Moon | WGPSN |
| Oxo | 42.21°N 0.4°W | 10 | 2015 | God of agriculture in Afro-Brazilian beliefs of Yoruba derivation | WGPSN |
| Piuku | 15.37°S 36.99°E | 31 | 2015 | Barama River Caribs (Guyana) god of the manioc | WGPSN |
| Rao | 8.1°N 119.01°E | 12 | 2015 | Polynesian god of turmeric | WGPSN |
| Razeka | 3.21°S 61.63°E | 38.38 | 2016 | Arabian tribal god worshipped as the provider of food | WGPSN |
| Rongo | 3.21°N 11.29°W | 68 | 2015 | Maori (New Zealand) god of agriculture of cultivated foods | WGPSN |
| Roskva | 58.9°N 26.98°W | 22 | 2015 | Teutonic goddess who symbolizes the ripe fields of harvest | WGPSN |
| Sekhet | 66.42°S 104.95°W | 40 | 2015 | Egyptian name of Isis as goddess of cultivated lands and fields | WGPSN |
| Shakaema | 3.66°S 33.93°E | 47 | 2015 | Jivaro (Ecuador and Peru) god of vegetation invoked in the planting and cultivation of bananas | WGPSN |
| Sintana | 48.07°S 46.2°E | 58 | 2015 | Columbian deity who produced the fertile black earth for sowing | WGPSN |
| Tafakula | 19.82°S 88.59°E | 34 | 2015 | Tongan (Polynesia) goddess invoked for favorable seasons for the crops | WGPSN |
| Tahu | 6.59°S 44.79°E | 25 | 2015 | Maori (New Zealand) personification of all food | WGPSN |
| Takel | 50.76°N 79.52°W | 22 | 2015 | Malaysian goddess in charge of the tuber harvest | WGPSN |
| Tawals | 39.06°S 121.98°W | 8.8 | 2016 | Polish god of the fields of the tilling | WGPSN |
| Tibong | 29.82°S 7.8°W | 36 | 2015 | Land Dayaks (Borneo/Kalimantan Indonesia) malevolent spirit who devours and depletes the rice | WGPSN |
| Toharu | 48.32°S 155.95°E | 86 | 2015 | Pawnee (Nebraska Central USA) god of food and vegetation | WGPSN |
| Tupo | 32.35°S 88.38°E | 36 | 2015 | Polynesian god of turmeric | WGPSN |
| Uvara | 45.66°S 110.76°W | 170 | 2015 | Indian and Iranian deity of plants and fields | WGPSN |
| Victa | 36.23°N 58.96°W | 32 | 2015 | Roman goddess of food and nourishment | WGPSN |
| Vinotonus | 43.02°N 95.12°E | 140 | 2015 | Celtic Briton god of vines | WGPSN |
| Xochipilli | 56.66°N 93.21°E | 22.7 | 2016 | Aztec fertility god associated with maize and flowers; patron of music and dance | WGPSN |
| Yalode | 42.58°S 67.52°W | 260 | 2015 | Dahomey goddess worshipped by women at the harvest rites | WGPSN |
| Zadeni | 70.36°S 38.34°E | 129.28 | 2015 | Ancient Georgian god of bountiful harvest | WGPSN |

back to top

== Charon (6) ==
| Crater | Coordinates | Diameter (km) | Approval Year | Eponym | Ref |
|---|---|---|---|---|---|
| Cora | 57.09°N 351.72°E | 9 | 2020 | Cora, the lead protagonist in the 2016 novel The Underground Railroad by Colson Whitehead | WGPSN |
| Dorothy | 58.53°N 40.58°E | 261 | 2018 | Dorothy Gale, protagonist of the Oz novels by L. Frank Baum | WGPSN |
| Nasreddin | 26.9°N 309.7°E | 29.7 | 2018 | Nasreddin, a Sufi traveler from folklore | WGPSN |
| Nemo | 15.7°S 314.1°E | 44 | 2018 | character in novels by Jules Verne | WGPSN |
| Pirx | 55.2°N 256.3°E | 90 | 2018 | main character in short stories by Stanisław Lem | WGPSN |
| Revati | 20.7°N 35.4°E | 40 | 2018 | main character in the Hindu epic narrative Mahabharata | WGPSN |
| Sadko | 16.1°S 331.2°E | 28 | 2018 | adventurer who traveled to the bottom of the sea in the medieval Russian epic Bylina | WGPSN |

back to top

== Dactyl (2) ==
| Crater | Coordinates | Diameter (km) | Approval Year | Eponym | Ref |
|---|---|---|---|---|---|
| Acmon | 39°S 138°E | 0.3 | 1997 | One of the original three Dactyls | WGPSN |
| Celmis | 46°S 140°W | 0.2 | 1997 | One of the original three Dactyls | WGPSN |

back to top

== Deimos (2) ==
| Crater | Coordinates | Diameter (km) | Approval Year | Eponym | Ref |
|---|---|---|---|---|---|
| Swift | 12.5°N 1.8°E | 1 | 1973 | Jonathan; British writer (1667–1745) | WGPSN |
| Voltaire | 22°N 3.5°W | 1.9 | 1973 | Francios-Marie Arouet; French writer (1694–1778) | WGPSN |

back to top

== Dione (73) ==
| Crater | Coordinates | Diameter (km) | Approval Year | Eponym | Ref |
|---|---|---|---|---|---|
| Acestes | 50.1°N 116.63°E | 108 | 2008 | King of Sicily | WGPSN |
| Adrastus | 61.66°S 46.57°W | 38.5 | 1982 | King of Argos one of the seven against Thebes and the only one to return alive | WGPSN |
| Aeneas | 25.89°N 46.27°W | 161 | 1982 | Hero of the Aeneid. The son of Anchises and Venus and a member of the royal family of Troy | WGPSN |
| Alcander | 52.89°S 64.51°E | 120 | 2011 | A Trojan defending Aeneas’ camp against the Rutulians killed by Turnus | WGPSN |
| Allecto | 7.73°S 135.44°E | 106 | 2008 | One of the Furies | WGPSN |
| Amastrus | 9.96°S 122.97°E | 62.4 | 2008 | A Trojan victim of Camilla | WGPSN |
| Amata | 5.17°N 80.19°E | 76 | 1982 | Mother of Lavinia (wife of Aeneas) | WGPSN |
| Amycus | 37.52°S 88.62°W | 27.3 | 2008 | A Trojan comrade of Aeneas | WGPSN |
| Anchises | 34°S 65°W | 47 | 1982 | Aeneas' father | WGPSN |
| Anna | 63.38°S 89.96°W | 14.2 | 2008 | Sister and confidante of Dido | WGPSN |
| Antenor | 7°S 11.54°W | 81 | 1982 | Nephew of Priam. He escaped the fall of Troy and reached Italy before Aeneas where he founded Padua | WGPSN |
| Ascanius | 33.43°N 127.82°E | 98 | 2008 | Son of Aeneas by Creusa | WGPSN |
| Assaracus | 32.65°N 8.79°W | 60 | 2011 | Early king of Troy son of Tros brother of Ilus and Ganymede | WGPSN |
| Aulestes | 9.9°N 147.73°W | 50 | 2008 | Etruscan chief ally of Aeneas | WGPSN |
| Butes | 65.72°N 46.4°W | 35 | 1982 | A famous boxer who had been defeated by Dares | WGPSN |
| Caieta | 24.71°S 79.63°W | 50 | 1982 | A nurse of Aeneas | WGPSN |
| Camilla | 4.36°S 60.61°W | 31.9 | 2008 | A warrior maiden; ally of Turnus | WGPSN |
| Cassandra | 39.84°S 113.78°E | 13 | 1982 | Daughter of Priam; she could foretell the future | WGPSN |
| Catillus | 2.38°S 84.7°E | 42.2 | 1982 | Brother of Tiburtus and twin brother of Coras | WGPSN |
| Coras | 0.39°N 91.55°E | 43 | 1982 | Brother of Tiburtus and twin brother of Catillus. He was founder of Tibur and an ally of Turnus against Aeneas | WGPSN |
| Cretheus | 43.35°S 88.53°W | 29 | 2008 | A Trojan warrior who took part in the defense of Aeneas’ camp against the Rutulians | WGPSN |
| Creusa | 49.19°N 76.32°W | 36.2 | 1982 | Daughter of Priam; first wife of Aeneas | WGPSN |
| Daucus | 15.38°S 58.86°E | 80 | 2008 | A Rutulian father of the twins Thymber and Larides | WGPSN |
| Dercennus | 29.75°N 80.07°E | 86.2 | 2008 | Ancient king of the Laurentians | WGPSN |
| Dido | 23.97°S 18.82°W | 122 | 1982 | Tyrian princess who founded Carthage | WGPSN |
| Entellus | 10.93°S 149.46°E | 63 | 2008 | Sicilian boxing champion | WGPSN |
| Erulus | 35°S 104.76°W | 120 | 2008 | Superhuman son of the goddess Feronia | WGPSN |
| Eumelus | 0.1°S 65.96°W | 35.1 | 2008 | A Trojan companion of Aeneas | WGPSN |
| Euryalus | 74.36°S -0°E | 35 | 2008 | A Trojan companion of Aeneas friend of Nisus | WGPSN |
| Evander | 57°S 145°W | 350 | 2008 | Son of Mercury by Carmentis ally of Aeneas against the Latins mythical king of Arcadia founded and ruled Pallanteum built on the future site of Rome | WGPSN |
| Fadus | 35.94°S 134.82°E | 47 | 2011 | A Rutulian of those besieging the men of Aeneas in their leader's absence | WGPSN |
| Galaesus | 46.77°N 63.75°E | 79 | 2011 | An old Italian killed in the first fighting between Latins and Trojans while trying to make peace | WGPSN |
| Haemon | 84.33°N 83.69°E | 65.22 | 2011 | There are two persons in the Aeneid with this name: (a) a Rutulian from a group attacking the Trojan's camp in the absence of Aeneas and (b) an Italian whose son priest of Apollo and Diana was a soldier of Turnus | WGPSN |
| Halys | 59.17°S 53.72°W | 35.2 | 1982 | A Trojan defending Aeneas' camp against the Rutulian attack. He was killed by Turnus | WGPSN |
| Herbesus | 34.68°N 156.11°W | 58.4 | 2008 | A Rutulian who besieged Aeneas' camp | WGPSN |
| Iasus | 22.13°S 114.08°E | 54 | 2011 | There are two persons in the Aeneid with this name: (a) father of Palinurus and (b) father of Iapyx | WGPSN |
| Ilia | 0.5°S 13.73°E | 52.4 | 1982 | Also known as Rhea Silvia; Mother by Mars of Romulus and Remus the founders of Rome | WGPSN |
| Italus | 18.47°S 76.41°W | 35.7 | 1982 | Ancient hero eponymous ancestor of the Italians | WGPSN |
| Lagus | 13.56°S 102.95°W | 77 | 2008 | A soldier of Turnus | WGPSN |
| Lamyrus | 53.67°N 104.39°E | 61 | 2011 | A Rutulian with the troops besieging the camp of Aeneas | WGPSN |
| Larides | 7.17°N 48.58°E | 29 | 2008 | A Rutulian member of Turnus’ army son of Daucus twin brother of Thymber | WGPSN |
| Latagus | 14.65°N 26.46°W | 41 | 1982 | Soldier of Aeneas | WGPSN |
| Latinus | 52.19°N 159°E | 130 | 2008 | King of Latium husband of Amata | WGPSN |
| Lausus | 34.81°N 22.76°W | 23.5 | 1982 | Son of Mezentius killed by Aeneas | WGPSN |
| Liger | 24°N 126.63°W | 53 | 2008 | Soldier of Turnus brother of Lucagus | WGPSN |
| Lucagus | 22.15°N 131.25°W | 45.7 | 2008 | Soldier of Turnus brother of Liger | WGPSN |
| Magus | 18.44°N 24.35°W | 45.8 | 1982 | A soldier of Turnus killed by Aeneas | WGPSN |
| Massicus | 35°S 55.39°W | 39 | 1982 | An Etruscan ally of Aeneas | WGPSN |
| Metiscus | 6°N 93.29°W | 43.8 | 2008 | A Rutulian charioteer of Turnus | WGPSN |
| Mezentius | 19.16°N 177°E | 51 | 2008 | Etruscan king ally of Turnus father of Lausus | WGPSN |
| Murranus | 12.82°N 90.73°W | 56.8 | 2008 | A Rutulian | WGPSN |
| Nisus | 68.18°S 25°E | 35 | 2008 | Trojan companion of Aeneas friend of Euryalus | WGPSN |
| Oebalus | 44.47°N 8.4°E | 35.7 | 2011 | An ally of Turnus son of Telon and Sebethis | WGPSN |
| Pagasus | 3°S 119°E | 67 | 2008 | An Etruscan killed by Camilla | WGPSN |
| Palinurus | 3.3°S 63°W | 11.9 | 1982 | Pilot of Aeneas' fleet | WGPSN |
| Phaleris | 77.4°S 166.58°W | 44 | 2008 | Trojan defending Aeneas' camp against Rutulian attack | WGPSN |
| Phorbas | 81.2°N 131.29°W | 69.3 | 2011 | A Trojan companion of Aeneas | WGPSN |
| Prytanis | 46.25°S 72.6°E | 96 | 2008 | Trojan defending Aeneas' camp against Rutulian attack | WGPSN |
| Remus | 13.58°S 31.9°W | 62 | 1982 | He and his brother Romulus founded Rome | WGPSN |
| Ripheus | 56.47°S 36.8°W | 34 | 1982 | A Trojan. He fought at the side of Aeneas during Troy's last night | WGPSN |
| Romulus | 8.15°S 26.85°W | 90.7 | 1982 | Mythical founder of Rome in 754 or 753 B.C. son of Mars by Ilia (Rhea Silvia) | WGPSN |
| Sabinus | 43.65°S 173.34°E | 88 | 1982 | Fabled ancestor of the Sabines | WGPSN |
| Sagaris | 4.93°N 104.2°W | 53 | 2008 | Servant of Aeneas | WGPSN |
| Salius | 65.09°N 178.27°E | 44 | 2011 | There are two persons in the Aeneid with this name: (a) a companion of Aeneas and a contestant in the foot race and (b) a Rutulian | WGPSN |
| Silvius | 32.7°S 27.74°E | 74 | 2008 | Son of Aeneas and Lavinia | WGPSN |
| Sulmo | 55.92°N 26.5°E | 56 | 2011 | There are two persons in the Aeneid with this name: (a) a Rutulian in the troop of Volcens and (b) an Italian whose sons fought for Turnus | WGPSN |
| Telon | 16.2°S 97.2°W | 39.7 | 2011 | Ruler of the Teleboans on Capri; father of Oebalus | WGPSN |
| Tereus | 2.6°S 115°E | 45 | 2008 | A Trojan killed by Camilla | WGPSN |
| Thymber | 14°N 50.85°E | 27.29 | 2008 | A Rutulian member of Turnus’ army son of Daucus twin brother of Larides | WGPSN |
| Tiburtus | 29.11°N 170.27°E | 59 | 2008 | Brother of the twins Catillus and Coras founder of Tibur to which he gave his name | WGPSN |
| Turnus | 15.59°N 14.69°E | 101 | 1982 | Rutililan king; Aeneas' rival for hand of Lavinia | WGPSN |
| Tyrrhus | 24.7°N 72.1°E | 49.1 | 2008 | Keeper of the herds for Latinus father of Silvia | WGPSN |
| Volcens | 13.84°S 91.49°E | 74 | 2011 | A Latin leader of cavalry sent as reinforcements to Turnus | WGPSN |

back to top

== Enceladus (53) ==
| Crater | Coordinates | Diameter (km) | Approval Year | Eponym | Ref |
|---|---|---|---|---|---|
| Ahmad | 57.87°N 49.98°E | 18.13 | 1982 | Youngest son; brings father a magic apple; marries the Genie Peri Banu | WGPSN |
| Ajib | 61.68°N 120.61°E | 15.68 | 2009 | Brother of Gharib in the tale The History of Gharib and His Brother Ajib | WGPSN |
| Aladdin | 62.69°N 22.14°W | 30.53 | 1982 | Hero of the tale; he has the magic lamp | WGPSN |
| Al-Bakbuk | 5.26°N 168.38°E | 9.2 | 2006 | The barber's first brother in The Hunchback's Tale | WGPSN |
| Al-Fakik | 35.52°N 53.45°E | 15.2 | 2006 | The barber's third brother in The Hunchback's Tale | WGPSN |
| Al-Haddar | 50.48°N 159.22°E | 15.08 | 2006 | The barber's second brother in The Hunchback's Tale | WGPSN |
| Ali Baba | 56.84°N 17.51°W | 34.09 | 1982 | Hero of tale who found a great treasure owned by 40 thieves | WGPSN |
| Al-Kuz | 18.88°S 178.66°W | 10.15 | 2006 | The barber's fourth brother in "The Hunchback’s Tale." | WGPSN |
| Al-Mustazi | 21.09°S 158.25°E | 9.98 | 2006 | Father of benevolent prince Al-Mustansir in The Hunchback's Tale | WGPSN |
| Ayyub | 38.58°N 64.98°E | 17.45 | 2006 | Damascus merchant father of Ghanim and Fitnah in the Tale of Ghanim Bin Ayyub the Distraught the Thrall O’ Love | WGPSN |
| Aziz | 17.73°N 11.51°E | 10.52 | 2006 | Man betrothed to his cousin Azizah in The tale of Aziz and Azizah | WGPSN |
| Bahman | 14.7°N 61.37°W | 10.56 | 2009 | Oldest Prince brother of Parwez and Perizadah in the tale The Two Sisters Who Envied Their Cadette | WGPSN |
| Behram | 15.43°S 178.51°E | 13.29 | 2006 | Son of a Persian king in the tale Prince Behram and the Princess Al-Datma | WGPSN |
| Dalilah | 51.55°N 110.35°E | 15.51 | 1982 | Crafty old crone who fools several men | WGPSN |
| Duban | 58.07°N 78.74°E | 18.73 | 1982 | Sage who cured King Yunan of leprosy | WGPSN |
| Dunyazad | 41.51°N 157.96°E | 30.81 | 1982 | Sister of Shahrazad | WGPSN |
| Fitnah | 45.39°N 70.01°E | 15.54 | 2006 | Daughter of Ayyub sister of Ghanim in the Tale of Ghanim Bin Ayyub the Distraught the Thrall O’ Love | WGPSN |
| Ghanim | 38.74°N 79.22°E | 14.18 | 2006 | Son of Ayyub brother of Fitnah in the Tale of Ghanim Bin Ayyub the Distraught the Thrall O’Love | WGPSN |
| Gharib | 81.12°N 118.85°E | 26 | 1982 | Hero of many tales | WGPSN |
| Harun | 36.47°N 134.26°E | 14.58 | 2009 | Harun al-Rashid; Caliph in many tales for example Harun Al-Rashid and the Two Slave-Girls | WGPSN |
| Hassan | 31.57°S 171.09°E | 15.27 | 2006 | Character in the tale Hassan of Bassorah | WGPSN |
| Hisham | 48.25°N 79.59°E | 21.4 | 2009 | Caliph in the tale The Caliph Hisham and the Arab Youth | WGPSN |
| Ishak | 47.6°N 134.98°E | 13.84 | 2009 | Character in the tale Isaac of Mosul and the Merchant | WGPSN |
| Ja'afar | 34.6°N 22.44°E | 10.15 | 2009 | Vizier of Harun al-Rashid in the tale Nur al-Din Ali and the Damsel Anis al-Jalis | WGPSN |
| Jansha | 30.65°S 157.4°W | 10.8 | 2006 | Female hero in The Story of Jansha | WGPSN |
| Julnar | 53.76°N 12.91°E | 17.32 | 1982 | The seaborn; heroine of nights 738 to 756 | WGPSN |
| Kamar | 40.62°S 32.25°W | 19.55 | 2009 | Kamar al-Akmár; Prince son of Sabur (King of Persia) in the tale The Ebony Horse | WGPSN |
| Kasim | 42.35°N 173.05°W | 10.53 | 2009 | The greedy brother of Ali Baba in the tale Ali Baba and the Forty Thieves | WGPSN |
| Khusrau | 4.1°S 174.14°E | 12.4 | 2006 | King husband of Shirin in the tale Khusrau and Shirin and the Fisherman | WGPSN |
| Ma'aruf | 37.16°S 26.42°E | 7.02 | 2009 | Hero in the tale Ma'aruf the Cobbler and His Wife Fatimah | WGPSN |
| Marjanah | 38.2°N 56.99°E | 12.95 | 2006 | Queen in the Tale of Kamar Al-Zaman | WGPSN |
| Masrur | 66.27°N 65.73°E | 15.13 | 2009 | Eunuch sworder in the tale Nur al-Din Ali and the Damsel Anis al-Jalis | WGPSN |
| Morgiana | 31.75°N 163.83°E | 15.4 | 2009 | Clever slave girl in the tale Ali Baba and the Forty Thieves | WGPSN |
| Musa | 73.85°N 11.59°W | 21.81 | 1982 | Goes to get the vessels that contain Jinni in The City of Brass | WGPSN |
| Mustafa | 30.76°S 175.05°E | 15.54 | 2009 | Old tailor in the tale Aladdin; or The Wonderful Lamp | WGPSN |
| Omar | 17.89°N 86.03°E | 11.54 | 2006 | Great king father of Sharrkan and Zau al-Makán in The Tale of King Omar and his Sons | WGPSN |
| Otbah | 40.03°S 159.8°W | 10.02 | 2006 | Figure in the tale Otbah and Rayya | WGPSN |
| Parwez | 22.95°N 25.56°W | 13.49 | 2009 | Second prince brother of Bahman and Perizadah in the tale The Two Sisters Who Envied Their Cadette | WGPSN |
| Peri-Banu | 62.04°N 40.86°E | 14.89 | 1982 | Genie who marries Ahmad and helps him fulfill the demands of his father | WGPSN |
| Perizadah | 21.12°S 155.11°W | 10.43 | 2009 | Youngest princess sister of Bahman and Parwez in the tale The Two Sisters Who Envied Their Cadette | WGPSN |
| Rayya | 32.41°S 178.88°W | 9.54 | 2006 | Female character in the tale Otbah and Rayya | WGPSN |
| Sabur | 23.9°S 63.82°E | 7.53 | 2009 | King of Persia and father of Kamar in the tale The Ebony Horse | WGPSN |
| Salih | 5.99°S 4.4°W | 4.41 | 1982 | Brother of Julnar | WGPSN |
| Samad | 61.69°N 1.23°W | 14.98 | 1982 | Shayk who guides Musa and Talib to the mountains in The City of Brass | WGPSN |
| Shahrazad | 46.5°N 158.4°E | 19.91 | 1982 | Heroine who tells King Shahryar The Tales of a Thousand Nights | WGPSN |
| Shahryar | 57.71°N 133.31°E | 24 | 1982 | King whom Shahrazad beguiles with the tales of a thousand nights and a night | WGPSN |
| Shakashik | 17.59°S 178.74°E | 8.5 | 2006 | The barber's sixth brother in The Hunchback's Tale | WGPSN |
| Sharrkan | 16.42°N 58.09°E | 4.3 | 2006 | Son of the great King Omar in The Tale of King Omar and his Sons | WGPSN |
| Shirin | 2.27°S 172.82°W | 8.84 | 2006 | Wife of King Khusrau in the tale Khusrau and Shirin and the Fisherman | WGPSN |
| Sindbad | 66.97°N 148.39°E | 29.44 | 1982 | Voyager who had many marvelous adventures on seven voyages | WGPSN |
| Yunan | 53.95°N 74.21°E | 19.52 | 2009 | Fictional king of Persian city in the tale The Tale of the Vizier and the Sage Duban | WGPSN |
| Zaynab | 69.52°N 26.97°W | 23.8 | 2009 | Daughter of Dalilah in the tale The Rogueries of Dalilah the Crafty and Her Daughter Zaynab the Coney-Catcher | WGPSN |
| Zumurrud | 22.23°S 177.95°E | 20.8 | 2006 | Female character in the tale Ali Shar and Zumurrud | WGPSN |

back to top

== Epimetheus (2) ==
| Crater | Coordinates | Diameter (km) | Approval Year | Eponym | Ref |
|---|---|---|---|---|---|
| Hilairea [error for Hilaeira] | | n.a. | 1982 | Greek; sister of Phoibe daughter of Leukippos | WGPSN |
| Pollux | | n.a. | 1982 | Latin name for Polydeukes Castor's twin | WGPSN |

back to top

== Eros (37) ==
| Crater | Coordinates | Diameter (km) | Approval Year | Eponym | Ref |
|---|---|---|---|---|---|
| Abelard | 3.5°S 12.2°W | 1.1 | 2003 | Peter; French philosopher lover of Heloise (1079–1142) | WGPSN |
| Aida | 7.9°N 130.5°W | 1.6 | 2003 | Ethiopian slave beloved of Egyptian officer Radames in Verdi's opera Aida (Italy 1870) | WGPSN |
| Avtandil | 22.5°S 126.9°E | 1.2 | 2003 | Lover of Tinatin in Shota Rustavely's novel Knight in tiger-skin (Georgia 12th century) | WGPSN |
| Bovary | 61°S 27.3°W | 0.8 | 2003 | Romantic heroine of Flaubert's novel Madame Bovary (France 19th century) | WGPSN |
| Casanova | 46.6°N 124°E | 0.9 | 2003 | Giovanni; Italian adventurer lover and author (1725–1798) | WGPSN |
| Catherine | 9.1°N 171.1°W | 1.1 | 2003 | Tragic lover of Heathcliff in Emily Brontë's novel Wuthering Heights (England 1847) | WGPSN |
| Cupid | 8.1°N 129.8°E | 1.8 | 2003 | Roman god of love equivalent of Eros | WGPSN |
| Don Juan | 29.5°N 3.3°E | 1.1 | 2003 | Lover character of medieval European legend retold in Molière's Don Juan (France 1665) | WGPSN |
| Don Quixote | 57.7°S 109.2°E | 0.9 | 2003 | Knight-errant imagined Dulcinea as his lady-love in Cervantes' Don Quixote (Spain 1605) | WGPSN |
| Dulcinea | 76.1°S 87.1°E | 1.4 | 2003 | Imaginary lady-love of the knight Don Quixote in Cervantes' Don Quixote (Spain 1605) | WGPSN |
| Eurydice | 13.5°N 170°W | 2.2 | 2003 | In Greek mythology wife of singer Orpheus who fails to bring her from Hades | WGPSN |
| Fujitsubo | 3.7°S 62.7°W | 1.7 | 2003 | Lover of Genji in The Tale of Genji by Murasaki Sikibu first modern novel (Japan c.1000) | WGPSN |
| Galatea | 10.2°S 176.9°E | 1.4 | 2003 | Woman in Greek mythology brought to life from statue by Pygmalion legendary king of Cyprus | WGPSN |
| Gamba | 20.6°S 54.1°W | 1.3 | 2003 | Marina; companion of astronomer Galileo Galilei (Italy 17th century) | WGPSN |
| Genji | 19.5°S 88.6°W | 1.5 | 2003 | Prince lover of Fujitsubo in The Tale of Genji by Murasaki Sikibu (Japan c.1000) | WGPSN |
| Heathcliff | 7.4°N 167.9°W | 1.1 | 2003 | Tragic lover of Catherine in Emily Brontë's novel Wuthering Heights (England 1847) | WGPSN |
| Himeros | 21.2°N 77.7°E | 10 | 2003 | Attendant of Eros; personification of the longing of love in Greek mythology | WGPSN |
| Hios | 9.4°S 130.9°W | 1.3 | 2003 | Love child of Poseidon and Hiona in Greek mythology; also island (Chios) in the Aegean Sea | WGPSN |
| Jahan | 74.2°N 66.5°E | 2.1 | 2003 | Shah; Mogul emperor built Taj Mahal in Agra India for wife Mumtaz Mahal (1592–1666) | WGPSN |
| Kastytis | 6.8°N 161.3°W | 1.7 | 2003 | Lithuanian blacksmith lover of sea goddess Jurate; taken by her to the sea floor | WGPSN |
| Leander | 25.6°N 149.7°E | 1.4 | 2003 | Lover of Hero swam to her across Hellespont every night and drowned; in despair Hero drowned herself | WGPSN |
| Leylie | 3°S 23.5°W | 1.9 | 2003 | Majnoon's lover in Leylie and Majnoon poems by Jami and Navoi (Khorasan 1480s) | WGPSN |
| Lolita | 35.2°S 162.3°E | 1.8 | 2003 | Young girl from V. Nabokov's novel Lolita (USA 1955) | WGPSN |
| Mahal | 79.4°N 170°W | 1.2 | 2003 | Mumtaz; Mogul empress; favorite wife of Shah Jahan who built Taj Mahal (1592–1631) | WGPSN |
| Majnoon | 3.8°N 28.8°W | 2.1 | 2003 | Leylie's lover in Leylie and Majnoon poems by Jami and Navoi (Khorasan 1480s) | WGPSN |
| Mélisande | 67.1°N 174.4°E | 1 | 2003 | Wife of Prince Golaud and lover of his half-brother Pelléas in Maeterlinck drama (Belgium 1892) | WGPSN |
| Narcissus | 18.2°N 7.1°W | 2.9 | 2003 | Young man from Greek mythology who fell in love with his own reflection in water | WGPSN |
| Orpheus | 25.6°N 176.7°W | 1.1 | 2003 | Singer and musician in Greek mythology; fails to bring his love Eurydice from Hades | WGPSN |
| Pao-yü | 73.2°S 105.6°W | 0.8 | 2003 | Lover of Tai-yü in novel by Ts'ao Chan (China 18th century; also Dream of the Red Chamber 1929) | WGPSN |
| Pelléas | 63.1°N 138.7°E | 1.2 | 2003 | Beloved of Mélisande in Maeterlinck drama and later musical works by Faure Debussy and Schoenberg | WGPSN |
| Psyche | 31.6°N 94.6°W | 4.8 | 2003 | Beloved of Eros; personification of human soul in Greek mythology | WGPSN |
| Pygmalion | 1.8°S 168.9°E | 1.7 | 2003 | King of Cyprus; carved statue of woman brought to life as Galatea whom he married | WGPSN |
| Radames | 5.2°S 115.1°W | 1.6 | 2003 | Egyptian officer beloved of Ethiopian slave Aida in Verdi's opera Aida (Italy 1870) | WGPSN |
| Selene | 14.2°S 12.5°W | 3.6 | 2003 | Moon goddess in Greek mythology lover of Endymion | WGPSN |
| Tai-yü | 47°S 126.1°W | 1.4 | 2003 | Beloved by Pao-yü in novel by Ts'ao Chan (China 18th century; also Dream of the Red Chamber 1929) | WGPSN |
| Tutanekai | 56.4°N 3.3°W | 2.1 | 2003 | Māori hero beloved of young maiden Hinemoa who swam across Lake Rotorua to marry him | WGPSN |
| Valentine | 14.6°N 151.6°E | 2.2 | 2003 | St. Valentine's Day (principally Roman) for all lovers | WGPSN |

back to top

== Europa (41) ==
| Crater | Coordinates | Diameter (km) | Approval Year | Eponym | Ref |
|---|---|---|---|---|---|
| Áine | 43°S 177.5°W | 5 | 2000 | Áine | WGPSN |
| Amergin | 14.7°S 129.4°E | 17 | 2000 | Amergin | WGPSN |
| Angus | 12.6°S 75.1°W | 4.5 | 2000 | Angus | WGPSN |
| Avagddu | 1.4°N 169.5°W | 10 | 2000 | Avagddu | WGPSN |
| Balor | 52.8°S 97.8°W | 4.8 | 2000 | Balor | WGPSN |
| Brigid | 10.8°N 81.3°W | 9.5 | 2000 | Brigid | WGPSN |
| Camulus | 26.5°S 81.1°W | 4.5 | 2000 | Camulus | WGPSN |
| Cilix | 2.6°N 178.1°E | 15 | 1985 | Cilix | WGPSN |
| Cliodhna | 2.5°S 76.4°W | 3 | 2000 | Cliodhna | WGPSN |
| Cormac | 36.9°S 88.1°W | 4 | 2000 | Cormac mac Airt | WGPSN |
| Deirdre | 65.4°S 152.7°E | 4.5 | 2000 | Deirdre | WGPSN |
| Diarmuid | 61.3°S 102°W | 8.2 | 2000 | Diarmuid Ua Duibhne | WGPSN |
| Dylan | 55.3°S 84.4°W | 5.3 | 2000 | Dylan Eil Ton | WGPSN |
| Elathan | 31.9°S 79.8°W | 2.5 | 2000 | Elathan | WGPSN |
| Govannan | 37.3°S 57.2°E | 11.5 | 1997 | Govannan | WGPSN |
| Gráinne | 59.7°S 99.4°W | 13.5 | 2000 | Gráinne | WGPSN |
| Gwydion | 60.5°S 81.6°W | 5 | 2000 | Gwydion | WGPSN |
| Llyr | 1.8°S 138.2°E | 1.1 | 2000 | Llyr | WGPSN |
| Mael Dúin | 16.8°S 162.1°E | 2 | 2000 | Máel Dúin | WGPSN |
| Maeve | 58.8°N 78.9°W | 21.3 | 2000 | Maeve | WGPSN |
| Manannán | 3.1°N 120.3°E | 30 | 1997 | Manannán mac Lir | WGPSN |
| Math | 25.6°S 176.3°E | 10.8 | 2000 | Math ap Mathonwy | WGPSN |
| Morvran | 4.9°S 152.6°W | 15 | 1985 | Morvran | WGPSN |
| Niamh | 21.1°N 143.1°E | 5 | 2000 | Niamh | WGPSN |
| Oisín | 52.3°S 146.6°E | 6.2 | 2000 | Oísin | WGPSN |
| Pryderi | 66.1°S 159.1°W | 1.7 | 2000 | Pryderi | WGPSN |
| Pwyll | 25.2°S 88.6°E | 45 | 1997 | Pwyll | WGPSN |
| Rhiannon | 80.9°S 165.1°E | 15.9 | 1985 | Rhiannon | WGPSN |
| Taliesin | 22.8°S 138°W | 50 | 1985 | Taliesin | WGPSN |
| Tegid | 0.8°N 164.4°W | 29.7 | 1985 | Tegid Veol | WGPSN |
| Uaithne | 48.5°S 90.7°W | 6.5 | 2000 | Uaithne | WGPSN |

back to top

== Ganymede (131) ==
| Crater | Coordinates | Diameter (km) | Approval Year | Eponym | Ref |
|---|---|---|---|---|---|
| Achelous | 61.9°N 11.78°W | 40 | 1979 | Achelous, Greek river god; father of Callirrhoe, Ganymede's mother. | WGPSN |
| Adad | 57.43°N 1.98°E | 39 | 1979 | Adad, Assyro-Babylonian god of thunder. | WGPSN |
| Adapa | 73.08°N 31.32°W | 57 | 1979 | Adapa, Assyro-Babylonian; lost immortality when, at Ea's advice, he refused food of life. | WGPSN |
| Agreus | 15.87°N 127.3°E | 63 | 1985 | Agreus, Hunter god in Tyre. | WGPSN |
| Agrotes | 60.93°N 167.38°E | 74 | 1985 | Agrotes, Tyre; greatest god of Gebal; farmer god. | WGPSN |
| Aleyin | 15.14°N 134.08°W | 12.4 | 1997 | Aleyin, Son of Ba'al, spirit of springs. | WGPSN |
| Ammura | 31.76°N 17.65°E | 61.5 | 1979 | Amurru, Mesopotamian; god representing the western nomads. | WGPSN |
| Amon | 33.69°N 139.39°E | 102 | 1985 | Amon, Theban king of gods. | WGPSN |
| Amset | 14.41°S 178.75°W | 11 | 1997 | Amset, One of the four gods of the dead, son of Horus. | WGPSN |
| Anat | 4.1°S 128°W | 2.9 | 1985 | Anat, Ugaritic war goddess. Note: Defines 128 degrees longitude on Ganymede. | WGPSN |
| Andjeti | 52.75°S 161.1°W | 52 | 1985 | Andjeti, Egyptian; first god of Busirus. | WGPSN |
| Anhur | 32.63°N 167.68°E | 25 | 1997 | Anhur, Egyptian warrior god. | WGPSN |
| Antum | 5.09°N 141.06°E | 14.75 | 1985 | Antum, Mesopotamian; wife of Anu. | WGPSN |
| Anu | 65.24°N 15.75°E | 55 | 1979 | Anu, Mesopotamian sky god. | WGPSN |
| Anubis | 84.44°S 128.66°W | 114 | 1988 | Anubis, Egyptian jackal-headed god who opened the underworld to the dead. | WGPSN |
| Anzu | 63.51°N 62.73°W | 210 | 2000 | Anzu, Gigantic lion-headed bird-like figure, the Sumerian Thunderbird. | WGPSN |
| Apophis | 8.12°S 83.84°E | 57 | 2000 | Apophis, Egyptian gigantic serpent symbolizing chaos or nonexistence. | WGPSN |
| Ashîma | 39.05°S 122.98°W | 84 | 1985 | Ashîm, Semitic-Arab god of fate. | WGPSN |
| Asshur | 54.16°N 26.52°E | 25.5 | 1979 | Asshur, national god of ancient Assyria. | WGPSN |
| Atra-hasis | 22.54°N 105.89°E | 133 | 2000 | Atra-hasis, Exceedingly wise' hero of Akkadian myth, survived the great flood. | WGPSN |
| Aya | 68.34°N 37.98°E | 38 | 1979 | Aya, Mesopotamian dawn goddess; wife of Shamash. | WGPSN |
| Ba'al | 24.92°N 30.03°E | 43 | 1979 | Ba'al, Phoenician; Canaanite god. | WGPSN |
| Bau | 23.05°N 48.67°W | 77 | 1988 | Bau, Mesopotamian medicine goddess; daughter of Anu and patroness of Lagash. | WGPSN |
| Bes | 25.48°S 179.04°E | 63 | 1985 | Bes, Egyptian god of marriage. | WGPSN |
| Chrysor | 15.3°N 134.34°W | 7 | 1997 | Chrysor, Phoenician god; inventor of bait, fishing hooks and line, first to sail. | WGPSN |
| Cisti | 31.6°S 64.23°W | 70 | 1997 | Cisti, Iranian healing god. | WGPSN |
| Damkina | 30.17°S 4.88°W | 190 | 2006 | Damkina, wife of the Mesopotamian god Enki (Ea), mother of Marduk in Enuma Elish. | WGPSN |
| Danel | 4.33°S 21.3°W | 56 | 1979 | Danel, Phoenician; mythical hero versed in art of divination. | WGPSN |
| Dendera | 1.12°S 104.54°E | 82 | 2000 | Dendera, Town where Hathor was chief goddess. (Name changed from Dendera Facula.) | WGPSN |
| Diment | 23.14°N 8.23°E | 40 | 1979 | Diment, Egyptian goddess of the dwelling place of the dead. | WGPSN |
| Ea | 17.72°N 148.73°W | 20 | 1997 | Ea, Assyro-Babylonian god of water, wisdom, and the earth. | WGPSN |
| El | 1.01°N 151.36°W | 55 | 1997 | El, head of the pantheon of Ugarit in the late Bronze Age. | WGPSN |
| Enkidu | 26.61°S 34.87°E | 122 | 1982 | Enkidu, Friend of Gilgamesh. | WGPSN |
| Enlil | 55.36°N 47.9°E | 34.6 | 1979 | Enlil, head of the Mesopotamian pantheon. | WGPSN |
| En-zu | 11.59°N 168.4°W | 5 | 1997 | Enzu, one of the names of the Mesopotamian moon god. | WGPSN |
| Epigeus | 22.96°N 179.35°E | 343 | 1997 | Epigeus, Phoenician god. | WGPSN |
| Erichthonius | 15.32°S 175.26°W | 31 | 1997 | Erichthonius, Possible father of Ganymede. | WGPSN |
| Eshmun | 17.45°S 167.88°E | 98 | 1979 | Eshmun, Phoenician; divinity of Sidon. | WGPSN |
| Etana | 74.74°N 19.65°E | 46 | 1979 | Etana, Assyro-Babylonian; asked the eagle for an herb to give him an heir. | WGPSN |
| Gad | 13.56°S 137.56°W | 72 | 1985 | Gad, Semitic god of fate or good fortune. | WGPSN |
| Geb | 56.41°N 177.35°E | 60 | 1985 | Geb, Heliopolis Earth god. | WGPSN |
| Geinos | 18.64°N 140.56°E | 56 | 1985 | Geinos, Tyre; god of brick making. | WGPSN |
| Gilgamesh | 62.84°S 124.83°W | 153 | 1979 | Gilgamesh, Assyro-Babylonian; sought immortality after Enkidu died. | WGPSN |
| Gir | 34.05°N 145.75°W | 73 | 1985 | Girra, Mesopotamian fire god. | WGPSN |
| Gula | 64.15°N 12.3°W | 38 | 1979 | Gula, Mesopotamian; medicine goddess. | WGPSN |
| Gushkin | 20.75°N 45.98°W | 40.5 | 2016 | Gushkin-Banda, Sumerian patron god of goldsmiths. | WGPSN |
| Halieus | 34.45°N 167.14°W | 90 | 1985 | Halieus, Tyre; fisherman god. | WGPSN |
| Hapi | 30.57°S 147.34°E | 96 | 1988 | Hapi, Egyptian god of the Nile. | WGPSN |
| Harakhtes | 35.95°N 100.26°W | 108 | 2000 | Harakhtes, "Horus of the Two Horizons", form of Egyptian god Horus who represents the path of the sun. | WGPSN |
| Haroeris | 28.53°N 63.18°E | 70 | 2000 | Haroeris, Egyptian sky god whose eyes are the sun and the moon, a form of Horus. | WGPSN |
| Hathor | 66.9°S 91.26°E | 173 | 1979 | Hathor, Egyptian goddess of joy and love. | WGPSN |
| Hay-tau | 14.44°N 133.13°W | 27 | 1997 | Hay-tau, Nega god, spirit of forest vegetation. | WGPSN |
| Hedetet | 32.91°S 108.99°E | 106 | 2000 | Hedetet, Egyptian scorpion goddess. | WGPSN |
| Hershef | 47.39°N 90.62°E | 120 | 2000 | Hershef, Egyptian ram-headed god. | WGPSN |
| Humbaba | 55.15°S 67.31°W | 40 | 2000 | Humbaba, Babylonian terrifying guardian of the cedar forests. | WGPSN |
| Ilah | 22°N 160.62°W | 76 | 1985 | Ilah, First Sumerian sky god. | WGPSN |
| Ilus | 13.46°S 110.43°W | 90 | 1985 | Ilus, Ganymede's brother. | WGPSN |
| Irkalla | 32.52°S 114.84°W | 117 | 1985 | Irkalla, Sumerian goddess of underworld, seen by Enkidu in a dream. | WGPSN |
| Ishkur | 0.37°N 8.37°W | 67 | 1985 | Ishkur, Sumerian god of rain. | WGPSN |
| Isimu | 8.5°N 8.37°W | 89.5 | 1985 | Isimud, Sumerian god, servant of Enki. | WGPSN |
| Isis | 67.28°S 158.8°E | 75 | 1979 | Isis, Egyptian goddess; wife of Osiris. | WGPSN |
| Kadi | 47.68°N 178.5°W | 87 | 1985 | KA.DI, a writing of the name of the Mesopotamian god Ishtaran. | WGPSN |
| Khensu | 1.02°N 152.93°W | 17 | 1997 | Khensu, Egyptian moon god. | WGPSN |
| Khepri | 20.41°N 147.56°W | 47 | 1997 | Khepri, God of transformations for the Heliopitans. | WGPSN |
| Khonsu | 37.51°S 169.17°E | 80 | 1988 | Khonsu, Egyptian moon god. | WGPSN |
| Khumbam | 24.1°S 24.65°E | 57 | 1979 | Humban, Elamite god of kingship. | WGPSN |
| Kingu | 34.66°S 132.97°E | 78 | 1988 | Kingu, Babylonian; conquered leader of Tiamat's forces whose blood was used to create man. | WGPSN |
| Kishar | 72.7°N 10.54°E | 78 | 1979 | Kishar, Assyro-Babylonian; terrestrial progenitor goddess. | WGPSN |
| Kittu | 0.4°N 25.4°E | 15 | 1985 | Kittum, Mesopotamian; a goddess of justice. | WGPSN |
| Kulla | 33.22°N 113.87°W | 93 | 1985 | Kulla, Sumerian god of brick making. | WGPSN |
| Lagamal | 64.3°N 115.79°E | 131 | 2000 | Lagamal, Mesopotamian; minor underworld deity. | WGPSN |
| Latpon | 58.74°N 171.21°W | 43 | 1997 | Latpon, One of the sons of El. | WGPSN |
| Lugalmeslam | 23.72°N 166.11°E | 64 | 1997 | Lugalmeslam, Sumerian god of the underworld. | WGPSN |
| Lumha | 36.01°N 154.23°W | 58 | 1985 | Lumha, Title of Enki as patron of singers; also Babylonian priest. | WGPSN |
| Maa | 1.3°N 156.37°E | 31 | 1997 | Maa, Egyptian god of the sense of sight. | WGPSN |
| Mehit | 28.95°N 164.39°W | 47 | 1985 | Mehit, Egyptian lion-headed goddess; Anhur's wife. | WGPSN |
| Melkart | 9.86°S 173.93°E | 105 | 1979 | Melkart, Phoenician; divinity of Tyre. | WGPSN |
| Menhit | 36.31°S 140.32°W | 140 | 2006 | Menhit, Egyptian lion and war goddess. | WGPSN |
| Min | 29.23°N 1.26°W | 33 | 1988 | Min, Egyptian fertility god. | WGPSN |
| Mir | 3.3°S 129.7°E | 8 | 1985 | Mir, West Semitic god of wind. | WGPSN |
| Misharu | 4.31°S 24.11°E | 88 | 1985 | Misharu, Assyro-Babylonian god of law. | WGPSN |
| Mont | 44.62°N 48.05°E | 15 | 1997 | Mont, Theban war god. | WGPSN |
| Mor | 30.55°N 32.65°E | 41 | 1979 | Mor, Phoenician; spirit of the harvest. | WGPSN |
| Mot | 9.93°N 165.95°W | 23 | 1997 | Mot, Ugaritic personification of death. | WGPSN |
| Mush | 15.12°S 114.77°W | 99 | 1985 | ^{d}MUŠ, logographic writing of the name of the Sumerian snake god Nirah. | WGPSN |
| Nabu | 45.39°S 1.19°W | 40 | 1979 | Nabu, Mesopotamian; scribe god. | WGPSN |
| Nah-Hunte | 17.76°S 85.26°W | 47 | 2000 | Nahhunte, Elamite; sun god. | WGPSN |
| Namtar | 58.34°S 19.3°E | 50 | 1979 | Namtar, Assyro-Babylonian plague demon. | WGPSN |
| Nanna | 17.61°S 118.13°E | 56 | 1985 | Nanna, Sumerian moon god; god of wisdom. | WGPSN |
| Nefertum | 44.35°N 38.96°E | 29 | 1997 | Nefertum, Original divine son of the Memphis triad, son of Ptah. | WGPSN |
| Neheh | 72.13°N 62.66°W | 54 | 1985 | Neheh, Egyptian god of eternity. | WGPSN |
| Neith | 29.45°N 6.97°W | 90 | 1988 | Neith, Egyptian warrior goddess; goddess of domestic arts. | WGPSN |
| Nergal | 38.58°N 159.67°E | 9.6 | 1997 | Nergal, Assyro-Babylonian king of the underworld. | WGPSN |
| Nidaba | 17.75°N 123.43°W | 199 | 1985 | Nisaba, Sumerian scribal arts and grain goddess. | WGPSN |
| Nigirsu | 58.26°S 39.43°E | 53 | 1979 | Nigirsu, Mesopotamian; tutelary god of Girsu, portrayed as a warrior and a farmer. | WGPSN |
| Ningishzida | 14.11°N 170.16°E | 32 | 1997 | Ningishzida, Sumerian vegetation god. | WGPSN |
| Ninkasi | 59.21°N 48.85°W | 81 | 1988 | Ninkasi, Sumerian goddess of brewing. | WGPSN |
| Ninki | 8.37°S 120.79°W | 194 | 1985 | Ninki, Mesopotamian; primordial deity. | WGPSN |
| Ninlil | 6.27°N 118.32°W | 91 | 1985 | Ninlil, Mesopotamian; wife of Enlil, co-ruler of the pantheon. | WGPSN |
| Ninsum | 14.35°S 140.55°W | 88 | 1985 | Ninsun, Mesopotamian; Gilgamesh's divine mother. | WGPSN |
| Nut | 54.21°S 90.8°E | 90 | 1979 | Nut, Egyptian goddess of the sky. | WGPSN |
| Osiris | 38°S 166.31°W | 107 | 1979 | Osiris, Egyptian god of the dead. | WGPSN |
| Ptah | 65.9°S 142.95°E | 30 | 1988 | Ptah, Sovereign god of Memphis; patron of artisans. | WGPSN |
| Punt | 24.89°S 120.15°E | 135 | 1997 | Punt, Land east of Egypt where Bes originated. Changed from Punt Facula. | WGPSN |
| Ruti | 13.23°N 51.35°E | 16 | 1979 | Ruti, Phoenician; Byblos god. | WGPSN |
| Saltu | 14.15°S 7.23°E | 40 | 2006 | Saltu, Mesopotamian; a figure in the Agushaya Hymn representing discord and hostility. | WGPSN |
| Sapas | 57.45°N 33.99°W | 56 | 1979 | Shapash, Ugaritic; sun goddess, "torch of the gods." | WGPSN |
| Sati | 30.84°N 12.8°W | 95 | 1988 | Sati, Wife of Khnum, Egyptian god of the Cataracts. | WGPSN |
| Sebek | 61.25°N 3.22°E | 61 | 1979 | Sebek, Egyptian crocodile god. | WGPSN |
| Seima | 17.09°N 144.03°E | 38 | 1985 | Seima, Mother goddess of the Arameans. | WGPSN |
| Seker | 39.16°S 14.62°E | 103 | 1988 | Seker, Egyptian god of the dead at Memphis. | WGPSN |
| Selket | 15.03°N 105.7°W | 168 | 1985 | Selket, Tutelary goddess who guarded intestines of the dead. | WGPSN |
| Serapis | 12.4°S 44.11°W | 169 | 1997 | Serapis, Egyptian healing god. | WGPSN |
| Shu | 43.16°N 3.16°E | 44 | 1988 | Shu, Egyptian god of air. | WGPSN |
| Sin | 52.94°N 2.54°E | 19 | 1979 | Sin, Babylonian moon god. | WGPSN |
| Tammuz | 13.45°N 129.24°E | 51 | 1985 | Tammuz, Egyptian childbirth goddess. | WGPSN |
| Tanit | 57.49°N 36.62°W | 26 | 1979 | Tanit, Phoenician; tuterlary goddess of Carthage. | WGPSN |
| Tashmetum | 39.72°S 95.46°E | 135 | 2000 | Tashmetum, Assyro-Babylonian; wife of Nabu. | WGPSN |
| Ta-urt | 27.66°N 55.8°E | 94 | 1988 | Taweret, Egyptian goddess. | WGPSN |
| Teshub | 68.3°S 80.72°E | 188 | 1994 | Teshub, Hurrian; weather god. | WGPSN |
| Thoth | 43.22°S 147.25°W | 102 | 1985 | Thoth, Egyptian moon god; invented all arts and sciences. | WGPSN |
| Tros | 11.14°N 27.26°W | 94 | 1979 | Tros, Greek; father of Ganymede. | WGPSN |
| Upuant | 46.4°N 40.46°E | 17 | 1997 | Upuant, Jackal-headed warrior god, god of the dead. | WGPSN |
| We-ila | 12.36°S 69.65°E | 36 | 2000 | We-ila, Akkadian god from whom the hero Atra-hasis was created. | WGPSN |
| Wepwawet | 69.89°S 59.81°W | 86 | 2000 | Wepwawet, Ancient Egyptian jackal deity. | WGPSN |
| Zakar | 31.28°N 26.33°E | 170 | 1997 | Zakar, Mesopotamian dream god. | WGPSN |
| Zaqar | 58.16°N 37.41°W | 33 | 1979 | Zaqar, Mesopotamian dream god | WGPSN |

back to top

=== Dropped or not approved names ===
| Crater | Coordinates | Diameter (km) | Approval Year | Eponym | Ref |
|---|---|---|---|---|---|
| Keret | 16.0°N 35.2°W | 36.0 | 1979 | Dropped. Keret, Ugaritic hero. Name dropped because feature not found on imagery. | WGPSN |
| Khnum | 17.8°S 85.2°W | 45.0 | – | Not approved named. Khnum, Egyptian ram-headed creation god. Note: Provisional name Khnum changed to Nah-Hunte because of duplication with Khnum Catena. | WGPSN |
| Wadjet | 53.8°S 268.9°W | 100.0 | 2000 | Dropped name. Wadjet, Egyptian cobra goddess. Same crater as Nut. | WGPSN |

back to top

== Gaspra (31) ==
| Crater | Coordinates | Diameter (km) | Approval Year | Eponym | Ref |
|---|---|---|---|---|---|
| Aix | 47.9°N 160.3°W | 0.6 | 1994 | Spa in France | WGPSN |
| Alupka | 65°N 65°W | 0.3 | 1994 | Spa in Crimea Ukraine | WGPSN |
| Baden-Baden | 46°N 55°W | 0.3 | 1994 | Spa in Germany | WGPSN |
| Badgastein | 25°N 3°W | 0.4 | 1994 | Spa in Austria | WGPSN |
| Bagnoles | 55°N 122°W | 0.4 | 1994 | Spa in France | WGPSN |
| Bath | 13.4°N 9.7°W | 0.9 | 1994 | Spa in England | WGPSN |
| Beppu | 3.9°N 58.4°W | 0.6 | 1994 | Spa on Kyushu Japan | WGPSN |
| Brookton | 27.7°N 103.3°W | 0.3 | 1994 | Spa in New York USA | WGPSN |
| Calistoga | 30°N 2°W | 1.2 | 1994 | Resort in California USA | WGPSN |
| Carlsbad | 29.7°N 88.8°W | 0.5 | 1994 | Spa in Czech Republic | WGPSN |
| Charax | 8.6°N -0°E | 0.9 | 1994 | Roman fortress in Gaspra Crimea Ukraine | WGPSN |
| Helwan | 22.4°N 118.9°W | 0.4 | 1994 | Spa in Egypt | WGPSN |
| Ixtapan | 11.9°N 86.9°W | 0.7 | 1994 | Spa in Mexico | WGPSN |
| Katsiveli | 55°N 65°W | 0.3 | 1994 | Spa in Crimea Ukraine | WGPSN |
| Krynica | 49°N 35°W | 0.4 | 1994 | Health resort in Poland | WGPSN |
| Lisdoonvarna | 16.5°N 1.9°E | 0.4 | 1994 | Spa in Ireland | WGPSN |
| Loutraki | 42°N 140°W | 0.4 | 1994 | Spa in Greece | WGPSN |
| Mandal | 23.5°N 46.5°W | 0.1 | 1994 | Spa in Norway | WGPSN |
| Manikaran | 62°N 155°W | 0.5 | 1994 | Spa in India | WGPSN |
| Marienbad | 35.4°N 81.8°W | 0.6 | 1994 | Spa in Czech Republic | WGPSN |
| Miskhor | 15°N 65.9°W | 0.5 | 1994 | Spa in Crimea Ukraine | WGPSN |
| Moree | 15.1°N 164.4°W | 0.7 | 1994 | Spa in Australia | WGPSN |
| Ramlösa | 15°N 4.9°W | 0.7 | 1994 | Spa in Sweden | WGPSN |
| Rio Hondo | 31.7°N 20.7°W | 0.6 | 1994 | Spa in Argentina | WGPSN |
| Rotorua | 18.8°N 30.7°W | 0.5 | 1994 | Spa in New Zealand | WGPSN |
| Saratoga | 50°N 90°E | 2.8 | 1994 | Spa in New York USA | WGPSN |
| Spa | 51.5°N 152°W | 1.6 | 1994 | Health resort in Belgium | WGPSN |
| Tang-Shan | 59°N 104°E | 2.1 | 1994 | Spa in China | WGPSN |
| Yalova | 29°N 10°W | 0.4 | 1994 | Health resort in Turkey | WGPSN |
| Yalta | 57.6°N 98.7°E | 1.4 | 1994 | Spa in Crimea Ukraine | WGPSN |
| Zohar | 23°N 118°W | 0.4 | 1994 | Spa in Israel | WGPSN |

back to top

== Hyperion (4) ==
| Crater | Coordinates | Diameter (km) | Approval Year | Eponym | Ref |
|---|---|---|---|---|---|
| Bahloo | 36°N 164°E | n.a. | 1982 | Bahloo. The Moon; maker of girl babies (Aboriginal mythology) | WGPSN |
| Helios | 71°N 132°W | n.a. | 1982 | Helios. Greek sun god; son of Hyperion (Greek mythology) | WGPSN |
| Jarilo | 61°N 177°E | n.a. | 1982 | Jarilo, East Slavic god of the sun fertility and love (Slavic mythology) | WGPSN |
| Meri | 3°N 171°W | n.a. | 1982 | Meri, folk hero; the Sun (Bororó people) | WGPSN |

== Iapetus (58) ==
| Crater | Coordinates | Diameter (km) | Approval Year | Eponym | Ref |
|---|---|---|---|---|---|
| Abisme | 37.53°N 92.92°W | 767.74 | 2013 | A Saracen lord killed by Archbishop Turpin | WGPSN |
| Acelin | 42.7°N 154.9°W | 38 | 2008 | Aceline of Gascony one of the Twelve Peers the council of King Charles | WGPSN |
| Adelroth | 6.6°N 176.4°E | 57 | 2008 | Marsilion's nephew killed by Roland in the first battle | WGPSN |
| Almeric | 53.4°N 84°E | 43 | 1982 | One of 12 peers killed by Marsilion | WGPSN |
| Anseïs | 40.7°S 69.2°E | 48 | 2008 | One of the Twelve Peers; kills Turgis; killed by Malquiant | WGPSN |
| Astor | 14.9°N 38.8°E | 122 | 2008 | A French baron; ruled over Valence on Rhone | WGPSN |
| Baligant | 16.4°N 135.1°E | 66 | 1982 | Emir of Babylon; Marsilion enlisted his help against Charlemagne | WGPSN |
| Basan | 33.3°N 165.3°E | 76 | 1982 | French baron; Murdered while serving as Ambassador of Marsilon | WGPSN |
| Basbrun | 52°S 111.8°W | 80 | 2008 | Charlemagne's officer who hung Ganelon's 30 relatives | WGPSN |
| Basile | 0.7°S 172.1°E | 6 | 2008 | French baron; murdered near Haltile with his brother Basan while serving as ambassador to Marsilion | WGPSN |
| Berenger | 62.1°N 140.3°E | 84 | 1982 | One of twelve peers; killed Estramarin; killed by Grandoyne | WGPSN |
| Besgun | 76°N 50.2°E | 56 | 1982 | Chief cook for Charlemagne's army; he guarded Ganelon after Ganelon's treachery was discovered | WGPSN |
| Bevon | 70.7°N 93°W | 48 | 2008 | A French baron; killed by Marsilion | WGPSN |
| Bramimond | 38°N 178°W | 200 | 2008 | Queen of Saragossa wife of Marsilion | WGPSN |
| Charlemagne | 55°N 101.2°E | 95 | 1982 | Emperor of France and Germanic nations; his forces fought the Saracens in Spain | WGPSN |
| Clarin | 18.3°N 71.6°W | 84 | 2008 | Saracen lord and emissary to Charles | WGPSN |
| Climborin | 30.4°N 116.9°W | 49 | 2008 | Saracen lord who gave his helmet to Ganelon; killed by Oliver | WGPSN |
| Corsablis | 0.9°N 114.2°W | 73 | 2008 | Saracen lord; volunteered to fight at Roncevaux Pass; killed Archbishop Turpin in the first battle | WGPSN |
| Dapamort | 36.6°N 84.9°W | 49 | 2008 | A Saracen king from Lycia; leader in Baligant's army | WGPSN |
| Engelier | 40.5°S 95.3°E | 504 | 2008 | One of Twelve Peers the Gascon of Bordeaux; the most valiant knight killed by Climborin in the first battle | WGPSN |
| Escremiz | 1.6°N 173.5°W | 0.06 | 2008 | Escremiz of Valterne; volunteered to fight at Roncevaux Pass; killed by Engelier in the first battle | WGPSN |
| Eudropin | 0.9°N 139.3°E | 42 | 2008 | Saracen lord and emissary to Charles | WGPSN |
| Falsaron | 33.8°N 82.6°W | 424 | 2008 | Brother of King Marsilion; killed by Oliver | WGPSN |
| Ganelon | 44.3°S 19.8°W | 230 | 2008 | French count; stepfather of Roland; brother-in-law of Roland's uncle Charlemagne; betrays Roland and the French rear guard to Marsilion | WGPSN |
| Garlon | 3.2°S 119.5°E | 47 | 2008 | Saracen lord and emissary to Charles | WGPSN |
| Geboin | 58.6°N 173.4°W | 81 | 1982 | Guarded French dead; became leader of Charlemagne's 2nd column | WGPSN |
| Gerin | 45.6°S 127°E | 445 | 2008 | One of the Twelve Peers; kills Malprimis; killed by Grandoyne | WGPSN |
| Godefroy | 71.9°N 110.9°E | 63 | 1982 | Standard bearer of Charlemagne; brother of Tierri Charlemagne's defender against Pinabel | WGPSN |
| Grandoyne | 17.7°N 145.5°E | 65 | 1982 | Son of Cappadocian King Capuel; killed Gerin Gerier Berenger Guy St. Antoine Duke Astorge; killed by Roland | WGPSN |
| Hamon | 10.6°N 90°E | 96 | 1982 | Joint Commander of Charlemagne's Eighth Division | WGPSN |
| Ivon | 18°N 45°E | 100 | 2008 | Frankish baron one of the Twelve Peers | WGPSN |
| Johun | 12.4°N 83.4°W | 64 | 2008 | Johun of Outremer; Saracen lord and emissary to Charles | WGPSN |
| Jurfaleu | 13°N 2.5°W | 107 | 2008 | Son of Marsilion Saracen king of Spain | WGPSN |
| Lorant | 65.2°N 159.8°W | 44 | 1982 | French commander of one of first divisions against Baligant; killed by Baligant | WGPSN |
| Malprimis | 15.2°S 118.2°W | 377 | 2008 | A Saracen lord from Brigale; killed by Gerin in the first battle | WGPSN |
| Malun | 5.9°N 41.3°W | 121 | 2008 | A Saracen lord; killed by Oliver | WGPSN |
| Margaris | 27.7°N 135.8°W | 75 | 2008 | Saracen lord from Seville; volunteered to fight at Roncevaux Pass | WGPSN |
| Marsilion | 39.2°N 176.1°W | 136 | 1982 | Saracen king of Spain; Roland wounds him and he died of wound later | WGPSN |
| Matthay | 3.5°S 172.6°E | 58 | 2008 | Saracen lord and emissary to Charles | WGPSN |
| Milon | 67.9°N 89.8°E | 119 | 1982 | Guarded French dead while Charlemagne pursued Saracen forces | WGPSN |
| Naimon | 9.3°N 30.7°E | 244 | 2008 | King Charles’ wisest counselor | WGPSN |
| Nevelon | 33.2°S 163°E | 49 | 2008 | Shares command of Charlemagne's sixth division; leader of part of the 5th column | WGPSN |
| Ogier | 42.5°N 84.9°E | 100 | 1982 | Dane who led 3rd column in Charlemagne's army against Baligant's forces | WGPSN |
| Oliver | 62.5°N 159.2°E | 113 | 1982 | Roland's friend; mortally wounded by Marganice | WGPSN |
| Othon | 33.3°N 12.2°E | 86 | 1982 | One of twelve peers; guarded French dead while Charlemagne pursued Saracen forces; sixth column leader | WGPSN |
| Pinabel | 39°S 33°W | 83 | 2008 | Pinabel of Sorence a French baron Ganelon's kinsmen and skilled speaker. Large and powerful he agrees to fight Thierry to settle the issue of Ganelon's guilt and he lost the judicial combat | WGPSN |
| Priamon | 1.5°N 173°E | 17 | 2008 | Saracen lord and emissary to Charles | WGPSN |
| Rabel | 64.4°S 166.2°W | 91 | 2008 | A French baron; takes Roland's place at vanguard of Charlemagne's forces; leads first column | WGPSN |
| Roland | 73.3°N 25.2°W | 144 | 1982 | Charlemagne's nephew; led rear guard of French forces; hero in song of Roland | WGPSN |
| Rugis | 0.1°S 99°W | 19 | 2008 | Saracen lord one of the Saracen Twelve Peers | WGPSN |
| Samson | 6.5°N 61.4°E | 33 | 2008 | French baron Duke of Burgundy; one of the Twelve Peers; killed by Valdebron | WGPSN |
| Thierry | 55°S 8°W | 110 | 2008 | French knight; Duke of Argonne; brother of Godefroy Charlemagne's standard bearer. At Ganelon's trial Thierry alone insists on Ganelon's guilt | WGPSN |
| Tibbald | 57°N 2°E | 160 | 2008 | Tibbald of Reims; French baron; guarded French dead at Roncevaux | WGPSN |
| Timozel | 9.9°S 147.7°E | 58 | 2008 | A Saracen lord; killed by Gerin and Gerier in the first battle | WGPSN |
| Torleu | 0.2°S 171.6°E | 8 | 2008 | Leader in Baligant's army; king of Persia; killed by Rabel | WGPSN |
| Turgis | 16.9°N 28.4°W | 580 | 2008 | A Saracen baron; count of Tortelosa; killed by Oliver in the first battle | WGPSN |
| Turpin | 47.7°N 1.4°W | 87 | 1982 | Archbishop of Rheims in Song of Roland | WGPSN |
| Valdebron | 29.6°N 104.4°W | 49 | 2008 | Saracen lord gave his sword to Ganelon | WGPSN |

back to top

== Ida (21) ==
| Crater | Named after |
|---|---|
| Afon | Novy Afon Cave, Abkhazia |
| Atea | Atea Cave, Papua New Guinea |
| Azzurra | Azzurra Grotto, Italy |
| Bilemot | Bilemot Cave, Korea |
| Castellana | Castellana Cave, Italy |
| Choukoutien | Choukoutien, China |
| Fingal | Fingal's Cave, UK |
| Kartchner | Kartchner Caverns, AZ, United States |
| Kazumura | Kazumura Cave, HI, United States |
| Lascaux | Lascaux Cave, France |
| Lechuguilla | Lechuguilla Cave, NM, United States |
| Mammoth | Mammoth Cave, KY, United States |
| Manjang | Manjang Cave, Korea |
| Orgnac | Orgnac Cave, France |
| Padirac | Padirac Cave, France |
| Peacock | Peacock Cave, FL, United States |
| Postojna | Postojna Cave, Slovenia |
| Sterkfontein | Sterkfontein, South Africa |
| Stiffe | Stiffe Cave, Italy |
| Undara | Undara Cave, Australia |
| Viento | Viento Cave, Spain |

== Itokawa (10) ==
| Crater | Coordinates | Diameter (km) | Approval Year | Eponym | Ref |
|---|---|---|---|---|---|
| Catalina | 17°S 14°E | 0.02 | 2009 | Catalina Observatory near Tucson AZ USA | WGPSN |
| Fuchinobe | 34°N 91°W | 0.04 | 2009 | Place name in Sagamihara Japan | WGPSN |
| Gando | 76°S 155°W | n.a. | 2009 | Spanish launch facility on Gran Canaria | WGPSN |
| Hammaguira | 18°S 155°W | 0.03 | 2009 | French launch site in the Sahara Desert Algeria | WGPSN |
| Kamisunagawa | 28°S 45°E | 0.01 | 2009 | Town in Hokkaido Japan where a microgravity test facility is located | WGPSN |
| Kamoi | 6°N 116°W | 0.01 | 2009 | Town in Yokohama Japan where a factory of NEC TOSHIBA Space Systems Ltd. is located | WGPSN |
| Komaba | 10°S 102°E | 0.03 | 2009 | Place name in Tokyo where the Institute of Space and Astronautical Science is located | WGPSN |
| Laurel | 1°N 162°E | 0.02 | 2009 | City in Maryland USA where APL/JHU is located | WGPSN |
| Miyabaru | 40°S 116°W | 0.09 | 2009 | Radar site in the Uchinoura Space Center in Japan | WGPSN |
| San Marco | 28°S 41°W | n.a. | 2009 | An old oil platform near Kenya that served as a launch pad for Italian spacecraft | WGPSN |

back to top

== Janus (4) ==
| Crater | Coordinates | Diameter (km) | Approval Year | Eponym | Ref |
|---|---|---|---|---|---|
| Castor | | n.a. | 1982 | One of the Dioscuri; famous as a tamer of horses | WGPSN |
| Idas | | n.a. | 1982 | Twins; cousins of Gemini | WGPSN |
| Lynceus | | n.a. | 1982 | One of twin cousins of Gemini | WGPSN |
| Phoibe | | n.a. | 1982 | Daughter of Leukippos | WGPSN |

back to top

== Lutetia (19) ==
| Crater | Coordinates | Diameter (km) | Approval Year | Eponym | Ref |
|---|---|---|---|---|---|
| Bagacum | 46°N 49°E | 3.7 | 2011 | City at the time of Lutetia present-day Bavay in France | WGPSN |
| Basilia | 73°N 176°W | 3.5 | 2011 | City at the time of Lutetia present-day Basel in Switzerland | WGPSN |
| Bonna | 62°N 67°E | 6 | 2011 | City at the time of Lutetia present-day Bonn in Germany | WGPSN |
| Burdigala | 52°N 149°W | 10 | 2011 | City at the time of Lutetia present-day Bordeaux in France | WGPSN |
| Florentia | 23°N 137°E | 10.9 | 2011 | City at the time of Lutetia present-day Florence in Italy | WGPSN |
| Gaudiaco | 58°N 5°E | 6.7 | 2011 | City at the time of Lutetia present-day Joué-lès-Tours in France | WGPSN |
| Genua | 11°N 117°E | 1.8 | 2011 | City at the time of Lutetia present-day Genoa in Italy | WGPSN |
| Gerunda | 78°N 68°E | 4.7 | 2011 | City at the time of Lutetia present-day Girona in Spain | WGPSN |
| Lauriacum | 37°N 68°E | 1.5 | 2011 | City at the time of Lutetia present-day Enns in Austria; defines zero degrees longitude on Lutetia | WGPSN |
| Lugdunum | 10°N 141°W | 17 | 2011 | City at the time of Lutetia present-day Lyon in France | WGPSN |
| Massilia | 41°N 96°E | 61 | 2011 | City at the time of Lutetia present-day Marseille in France | WGPSN |
| Nicaea | 43°N 179°W | 21 | 2011 | City at the time of Lutetia present-day Nice in France | WGPSN |
| Patavium | 31°N 52°E | 9.3 | 2011 | City at the time of Lutetia present-day Padua in Italy | WGPSN |
| Roma | 13°N 117°W | 19 | 2011 | City at the time of Lutetia present-day Rome in Italy | WGPSN |
| Salomacus | 11°N 109°E | 7 | 2011 | City at the time of Lutetia present-day Salles (Gironde) in France | WGPSN |
| Salona | 32°N 37°E | 7.1 | 2011 | City at the time of Lutetia present-day Solin in Croatia | WGPSN |
| Syracusae | 39°N 32°W | 7 | 2011 | City at the time of Lutetia present-day Syracuse in Italy | WGPSN |
| Toletum | 87°N 161°E | 6 | 2011 | City at the time of Lutetia present-day Toledo in Spain | WGPSN |
| Turicum | 20°N 158°E | 3.8 | 2011 | City at the time of Lutetia present-day Zurich in Switzerland | WGPSN |

back to top

== Mimas (35) ==
| Crater | Coordinates | Diameter (km) | Approval Year | Eponym | Ref |
|---|---|---|---|---|---|
| Accolon | 70.56°S 175.59°E | 48 | 1982 | Companion of Arthur's; he was tricked into jousting with Arthur | WGPSN |
| Arthur | 35.4°S 163.96°E | 64 | 1982 | King of the Round Table Assemblage | WGPSN |
| Balin | 14.71°N 82.51°W | 35 | 1982 | Knight of matchless courage and virtue | WGPSN |
| Ban | 43.93°N 160.75°W | 37 | 1982 | King of Benwick; father of Sir Launcelot ally of Arthur in the battle of Bedgrayne | WGPSN |
| Bedivere | 9.57°N 149.42°W | 25 | 1982 | Arthurian knight | WGPSN |
| Bors | 41.82°N 172.3°W | 34 | 1982 | King of Gaul; father of Sir Ector de Marys Sir Bors Sir Lyonel | WGPSN |
| Dagonet | 47.84°N 98.38°E | 28 | 2008 | Fool at King Arthur's court | WGPSN |
| Dynas | 2.35°N 80.71°W | 35 | 1982 | A knight of the Round Table | WGPSN |
| Elaine | 46.33°N 107°W | 21 | 1982 | Daughter of King Pelles lover of Sir Launcelot and mother by him of Sir Galahad | WGPSN |
| Gaheris | 44.57°S 61.81°E | 23 | 1982 | Older son of King Lot; killed by Sir Launcelot in his rescue of Gwynevere from burning | WGPSN |
| Galahad | 45.32°S 145.31°W | 34 | 1982 | Bastard son of Launcelot and Elaine. He went on the quest to find the Holy Grail | WGPSN |
| Gareth | 43.06°S 72.22°E | 23 | 1982 | Youngest son of King Lot; killed by Sir Launcelot in his rescue of Gwynevere from burning | WGPSN |
| Gawain | 58.54°S 98.92°E | 27 | 1982 | Eldest son of King Lot; Arthur's favorite cousin | WGPSN |
| Gwynevere | 17.6°S 36.3°E | 42 | 1982 | Queen; wife of Arthur; lover of Launcelot | WGPSN |
| Herschel | 1.38°S 111.76°W | 139 | 1982 | William; German-British astronomer; discovered Mimas and Enceladus (1738–1822) | WGPSN |
| Igraine | 41.99°S 128.79°E | 38 | 1982 | Wife of Uther; mother of Arthur | WGPSN |
| Iseult | 47.24°S 33.78°W | 21 | 1982 | Loved by Tristram | WGPSN |
| Kay | 44.61°N 120.54°W | 24 | 1982 | Royal seneschal at Arthur's court | WGPSN |
| Lamerok | 62.27°S 70.82°E | 20 | 1982 | Pellinore's son; sent testing horn to King Mark to expose adultery of Sir Tristram | WGPSN |
| Launcelot | 9.46°S 31.51°E | 30 | 1982 | King Arthur's favorite; champion and lover of Queen Gwynevere | WGPSN |
| Lot | 31.46°S 128.4°E | 22 | 1982 | Leader of the rebel kings of the north and west. Married Margawse and begat Sir Gawain Sir Aggravayne Sir Gaheris | WGPSN |
| Lucas | 40.75°N 139.65°E | 40 | 2008 | Butler at King Arthur's court | WGPSN |
| Marhaus | 8.96°S 0.06°W | 34 | 2008 | Delivers poison wound to Tristram before being mortally wounded by him | WGPSN |
| Mark | 26.28°S 51.68°E | 20.8 | 1982 | King of Cornwall | WGPSN |
| Melyodas | 74.93°S 77.19°W | 40 | 2008 | King of Lyoness; marries King Mark's sister who dies bearing their son Sir Tristram | WGPSN |
| Merlin | 38.43°S 140.99°E | 37 | 1982 | Magician and prophet; son of the devil; Arthur's mentor | WGPSN |
| Modred | 4.15°N 140.32°E | 26 | 1982 | Arthur's bastard son and mortal enemy; delivered fatal wound to Arthur but was killed by him | WGPSN |
| Morgan | 24.21°N 115.02°E | 43 | 1982 | Arthur's half sister; enchantress; plotted to destroy Arthur but failed | WGPSN |
| Nero | 0.36°S 52.7°E | 22 | 2008 | King of the West principal enemy of Arthur | WGPSN |
| Palomides | 3.39°N 162°W | 10 | 1982 | Saracen enemy of Tristam | WGPSN |
| Pellinore | 29.76°N 135.45°W | 36 | 1982 | King whose duty was to pursue the questing beast and either run it to earth or lose his strength | WGPSN |
| Percivale | 3.01°S 178.86°W | 20 | 1982 | Very pure knight; accomplished quest of Holy Grail | WGPSN |
| Royns | 32.46°N 12.51°E | 22.1 | 2008 | King of the West principal enemy of Arthur | WGPSN |
| Tristram | 52.32°S 26°W | 20 | 1982 | Saved Iseult; fell in love with her | WGPSN |
| Uther | 35.16°S 109.83°E | 34 | 1982 | Ruler of all Britain; Arthur's father | WGPSN |

back to top

== Miranda (7) ==
| Crater | Coordinates | Diameter (km) | Approval Year | Eponym | Ref |
|---|---|---|---|---|---|
| Alonso | 44°S 7.4°W | 25 | 1988 | King of Naples in The Tempest | WGPSN |
| Ferdinand | 34.8°S 157.9°W | 17 | 1988 | Son of King of Naples; loves Miranda in The Tempest | WGPSN |
| Francisco | 73.2°S 124°W | 14 | 1988 | A lord of Naples in The Tempest | WGPSN |
| Gonzalo | 11.4°S 77°E | 11 | 1988 | Honest old counselor of Naples in The Tempest | WGPSN |
| Prospero | 32.9°S 30.1°W | 21 | 1988 | Rightful Duke of Mila in The Tempest | WGPSN |
| Stephano | 41.1°S 125.9°W | 16 | 1988 | A drunken butler in The Tempest | WGPSN |
| Trinculo | 63.7°S 163.4°E | 11 | 1988 | A jester in The Tempest | WGPSN |

back to top

== Oberon (9) ==
| Crater | Coordinates | Diameter (km) | Approval Year | Eponym | Ref |
|---|---|---|---|---|---|
| Antony | 27.5°S 65.4°E | 47 | 1988 | Shakespearean hero in Anthony and Cleopatra | WGPSN |
| Caesar | 26.6°S 61.1°E | 76 | 1988 | Shakespearean hero in Julius Caesar | WGPSN |
| Coriolanus | 11.4°S 14.8°W | 120 | 1988 | Shakespearean hero | WGPSN |
| Falstaff | 22.1°S 19°E | 124 | 1988 | Shakespearean character in Merry Wives of Windsor | WGPSN |
| Hamlet | 46.1°S 44.4°E | 206 | 1988 | Shakespearean hero | WGPSN |
| Lear | 5.4°S 31.5°E | 126 | 1988 | Shakespearean hero in King Lear | WGPSN |
| Macbeth | 58.4°S 112.5°E | 203 | 1988 | Shakespearean hero | WGPSN |
| Othello | 66°S 42.9°E | 114 | 1988 | Shakespearean character | WGPSN |
| Romeo | 28.7°S 89.4°E | 159 | 1988 | Shakespearean character in Romeo and Juliet | WGPSN |

back to top

== Phobos (17) ==
| Crater | Coordinates | Diameter (km) | Approval Year | Eponym | Ref |
|---|---|---|---|---|---|
| Clustril | 60°N 91°W | 3.4 | 2006 | Character in Lilliput who informed Flimnap that his wife had visited Gulliver privately in Jonathan Swift's novel Gulliver's Travels | WGPSN |
| D'Arrest | 39°S 179°W | 2.1 | 1973 | Heinrich L.; German/Danish astronomer (1822–1875) | WGPSN |
| Drunlo | 36.5°N 92°W | 4.2 | 2006 | Character in Lilliput who informed Flimnap that his wife had visited Gulliver privately in Jonathan Swift's novel Gulliver's Travels | WGPSN |
| Flimnap | 60°N 10°E | 1.5 | 2006 | Treasurer of Lilliput in Jonathan Swift's novel Gulliver's Travels | WGPSN |
| Grildrig | 81°N 165°E | 2.6 | 2006 | Name given to Gulliver by the farmer's daughter in the giants’ country Brobdingnag in Jonathan Swift's novel Gulliver's Travels | WGPSN |
| Gulliver | 62°N 163°W | 5.5 | 2006 | Lemuel Gulliver surgeon captain and voyager in Jonathan Swift's novel Gulliver's Travels | WGPSN |
| Hall | 80°S 150°E | 5.4 | 1973 | Asaph; American astronomer discoverer of Phobos and Deimos (1829–1907) | WGPSN |
| Limtoc | 11°S 54°W | 2 | 2006 | General in Lilliput who prepared articles of impeachment against Gulliver in Jonathan Swift's novel Gulliver's Travels | WGPSN |
| Öpik | 7°S 63°E | 2 | 2011 | Ernst J. Estonian astronomer (1893–1985) | WGPSN |
| Reldresal | 41°N 39°W | 2.9 | 2006 | Secretary for Private Affairs in Lilliput; Gulliver's friend in Jonathan Swift's novel Gulliver's Travels | WGPSN |
| Roche | 53°N 177°E | 2.3 | 1973 | Edouard; French astronomer (1820–1883) | WGPSN |
| Sharpless | 27.5°S 154°W | 1.8 | 1973 | Bevan P.; American astronomer (1904–1950) | WGPSN |
| Shklovsky | 24°N 112°E | 2 | 2011 | Iosif S. Soviet astronomer (1916–1985) | WGPSN |
| Skyresh | 52.5°N 40°E | 1.5 | 2006 | Skyresh Bolgolam High Admiral of the Lilliput council who opposed Gulliver's plea for freedom and accused him of being a traitor in Jonathan Swift's novel Gulliver's Travels | WGPSN |
| Stickney | 1°N 49°W | 9 | 1973 | Angeline; wife of American astronomer A. Hall (1830–1892) | WGPSN |
| Todd | 9°S 153°W | 2.6 | 1973 | David; American astronomer (1855–1939) | WGPSN |
| Wendell | 1°S 132°W | 1.7 | 1973 | Oliver C.; American astronomer (1845–1912) | WGPSN |

back to top

== Phoebe (24) ==
| Crater | Coordinates | Diameter (km) | Approval Year | Eponym | Ref |
|---|---|---|---|---|---|
| Acastus | 9.6°N 148.5°W | 34 | 2006 | Argonaut son of the Thessalian king Pelias took part in the Calydonian boar hunt | WGPSN |
| Admetus | 11.4°N 39.1°W | 58 | 2006 | Argonaut founder and king of Pherae in Thessaly | WGPSN |
| Amphion | 27°S 1.8°W | 18 | 2006 | Argonaut son of Hyperasius and Hypso | WGPSN |
| Butes | 49.6°S 67.5°E | 29 | 2006 | Argonaut son of Teleon bee-master | WGPSN |
| Calais | 38.7°S 134.6°E | 31 | 2006 | Argonaut son of Boreas the north wind | WGPSN |
| Canthus | 69.6°S 17.8°E | 44 | 2006 | Argonaut son of Kanethos or Cerion the only member of the expedition to die in combat | WGPSN |
| Clytius | 46°N 166.9°E | 52 | 2006 | Argonaut son of Eurytus skilled archer who was killed by Apollo for challenging the god to a shooting match | WGPSN |
| Erginus | 31.6°N 22.9°E | 38 | 2006 | Argonaut son of Neptune helmsman of the Argo after the death of Tiphys | WGPSN |
| Euphemus | 31.3°S 28.9°E | 23 | 2006 | Argonaut son of Neptune and Europa | WGPSN |
| Eurydamas | 61.5°S 78.4°E | 19 | 2006 | Argonaut son of Ctimenus | WGPSN |
| Eurytion | 30.4°S 8°W | 14 | 2006 | Argonaut son of Kenethos or Cerion | WGPSN |
| Eurytus | 39.7°S 177.2°W | 89 | 2006 | Argonaut son of Mercury and Antianira | WGPSN |
| Hylas | 7.9°N 5.5°E | 30 | 2006 | Argonaut son of Theiodamas/Theodamas king of the Dryopes | WGPSN |
| Idmon | 67.1°S 162.2°E | 61 | 2006 | Argonaut son of Apollo and the nymph Cyrene or of Abas a prophet | WGPSN |
| Iphitus | 27.2°S 66.7°E | 22 | 2006 | Argonaut son of Eurytus Jason's host during his consultation with the Oracle at Delphi | WGPSN |
| Jason | 16.2°N 42.3°E | 101 | 2006 | The leading argonaut son of the Thessalian king Aeson delivered the Fleece | WGPSN |
| Mopsus | 6.6°N 109.1°W | 37 | 2006 | Argonaut prophesying son of Apollo | WGPSN |
| Nauplius | 31.5°N 118.5°E | 24 | 2006 | Argonaut son of Neptune and Amymone or of Klytoneos | WGPSN |
| Oileus | 77.1°S 96.9°W | 56 | 2006 | Argonaut king of the Locrians renowned for his courage in battle | WGPSN |
| Peleus | 20.2°N 167.8°E | 44 | 2006 | Argonaut son of Aeacus father of Achilles | WGPSN |
| Phlias | 1.6°N 0.9°E | 14 | 2006 | Argonaut son of Dionysus | WGPSN |
| Talaus | 52.3°S 34.8°E | 15 | 2006 | Argonaut son of Teleon or of Bias and Pero | WGPSN |
| Telamon | 48.1°S 92.6°W | 28 | 2006 | Argonaut son of Aeacus took part in the Calydonian boar hunt | WGPSN |
| Zetes | 20°S 137°E | 29 | 2006 | Argonaut son of Boreas the north wind | WGPSN |

back to top

== Pluto (14) ==
| Crater | Coordinates | Diameter (km) | Approval Year | Eponym | Ref |
|---|---|---|---|---|---|
| Burney | 45°N 130°E | 296 | 2017 | Venetia Burney, who suggested the name Pluto | WGPSN |
| Coradini | 42.88°N 191.43°E | 38 | 2022 | Angioletta Coradini, Italian planetary scientist | WGPSN |
| Coradini | 15.24°N 150.54°E | 45 | 2020 | Thomas Boyd | WGPSN |
| Edgeworth | 6.86°N 109.42°E | 149 | 2021 | Kenneth Edgeworth, Irish astronomer | WGPSN |
| Elliot | 10°N 140°E | 96 | 2017 | James Elliot, an MIT researcher who pioneered the use of stellar occultations | WGPSN |
| Hardaway | 46.85°N 140.97°E | 11.07 | 2020 | Lisa Hardaway, lead engineer of New Horizons's RALPH instrument | WGPSN |
| Hardie | 23.82°N 141.58°E | 25 | 2020 | Robert H. Hardie, American astronomer and co-discoverer of Pluto's rotational period | WGPSN |
| Khare | 27.85°N 94.56°E | 58 | 2019 | Bishun Khare, Indian-American atmospheric chemist who researched Pluto's tholin cycle | WGPSN |
| Kiladze | 28.39°N 212.92°E | 44.42 | 2019 | Rolan Kiladze, Georgian astronomer who researched Pluto's orbital dynamics | WGPSN |
| Kowal | 49.48°N 217.87°E | 66 | 2022 | Charles T. Kowal, American astronomer who discovered the ringed centaur 2060 Chiron | WGPSN |
| Oort | 7.86°N 92.05°E | 123 | 2021 | Jan Hendrik Oort, Dutch astronomer who proposed the hypothetical Oort cloud | WGPSN |
| Pulfrich | 77.80°N 135.99°E | 37.7 | 2020 | Carl Pulfrich, German physicist and inventor of the blink comparator, the device used to discover Pluto | WGPSN |
| Simonelli | 12.79°N 314.76°E | 286 | 2019 | Damon Simonelli, American astronomer who researched the formation of Pluto | WGPSN |
| Zagar | 5.74°S 155.23°E | 93 | 2020 | Francesco Zagar, Italian astronomer who studied Pluto's orbit | WGPSN |

back to top

== Proteus (1) ==
| Crater | Coordinates | Diameter (km) | Approval Year | Eponym | Ref |
|---|---|---|---|---|---|
| Pharos | 10°S 10°W | 255 | 1994 | Pharos, a former island near the Lighthouse of Alexandria | WGPSN |

== Puck (3) ==
| Crater | Coordinates | Diameter (km) | Approval Year | Eponym | Ref |
|---|---|---|---|---|---|
| Bogle | | n.a. | 1988 | Scottish mischievous spirits | WGPSN |
| Butz | | n.a. | 1988 | German roguish or evil spirits | WGPSN |
| Lob | | n.a. | 1988 | British mischievous spirits | WGPSN |

back to top

== Tethys (50) ==
| Crater | Coordinates | Diameter (km) | Approval Year | Eponym | Ref |
|---|---|---|---|---|---|
| Achilles | 0.6°N 35.62°E | 58.6 | 2008 | Son of Peleus and Thetis commander of the Myrmidons at Troy | WGPSN |
| Aietes | 41.44°S 6.23°W | 91 | 2008 | Brother of Circe | WGPSN |
| Ajax | 28.41°S 78°E | 88 | 1982 | Greek hero second only to Achilles | WGPSN |
| Alcinous | 30.31°N 147.39°E | 50 | 2008 | King of Phaeacia husband of Arete father of Nausicaa | WGPSN |
| Amphinomus | 14.87°S 128.7°W | 13.6 | 2008 | A suitor killed by Telemachus a favorite of Penelope | WGPSN |
| Anticleia | 51.31°N 32.37°W | 100.7 | 1982 | Mother of Odysseus | WGPSN |
| Antinous | 59.89°S 73.85°E | 138 | 1982 | Chief of the wooers; slain by Odysseus | WGPSN |
| Arete | 4.67°S 61°E | 13 | 1982 | Wife of Alcinous mother of Nausicaa | WGPSN |
| Circe | 12.6°S 54.66°W | 79 | 1982 | Changed Odysseus' companions into swine | WGPSN |
| Demodocus | 59.37°S 18.21°W | 125 | 2008 | Blind Phaeacian singer | WGPSN |
| Diomedes | 38.12°N 70.58°E | 48.57 | 2008 | Son of Tydeus king of Argos | WGPSN |
| Dolius | 30.15°S 149.67°E | 190 | 2008 | Old servant of Penelope | WGPSN |
| Elpenor | 53.43°N 96.31°E | 60 | 1982 | Follower of Odysseus | WGPSN |
| Euanthes | 7.86°N 121.09°E | 33 | 2008 | Father of Maron | WGPSN |
| Eumaeus | 23.1°N 51.12°W | 30 | 1982 | Faithful swineherd who greets Odysseus gave him warm cloak and guided him to palace | WGPSN |
| Eupithes | 18.71°N 171.21°W | 22.3 | 2008 | Father of Antinous | WGPSN |
| Eurycleia | 52.54°N 113.5°E | 31 | 1982 | Faithful old nurse of Odysseus | WGPSN |
| Eurylochus | 5.07°S 27.68°W | 44.8 | 2008 | Odysseus’ second in command | WGPSN |
| Eurymachus | 35.65°S 65°W | 38.4 | 2008 | One of the two leading suitors of Penelope killed by Odysseus | WGPSN |
| Halius | 44.4°N 4.96°W | 29.5 | 2008 | Son of Alcinous and Arete | WGPSN |
| Hermione | 38.4°S 148.69°W | 68.2 | 2008 | Daughter of Menelaus and Helen | WGPSN |
| Icarius | 5.89°S 54.15°E | 54.4 | 2008 | Father of Penelope | WGPSN |
| Irus | 27°S 115.19°E | 26.5 | 2008 | Ithacan beggar | WGPSN |
| Laertes | 46.36°S 67.46°W | 51.13 | 1982 | Father of Odysseus | WGPSN |
| Leocritus | 21.53°N 118.66°W | 12.5 | 2008 | A suitor of Penelope killed by Telemachus | WGPSN |
| Leucothea | 4.26°S 123.84°W | 13.8 | 2008 | Ino's name after she became a goddess | WGPSN |
| Maron | 2.52°N 119.33°W | 11.8 | 2008 | Son of Euanthes priest of Apollo at Ismarus | WGPSN |
| Medon | 25.5°N 143.31°W | 18.7 | 2008 | Herald of Odysseus in Ithaca | WGPSN |
| Melanthius | 58.5°S 167.39°E | 250 | 1982 | Disloyal goatherd; insults Odysseus; is slain | WGPSN |
| Mentor | 0.25°N 44.16°W | 62 | 1982 | Friend of Odysseus | WGPSN |
| Naubolos | 72.19°S 54.82°E | 54.5 | 2008 | Father of Euryalos | WGPSN |
| Nausicaa | 84.4°N 5°W | 69 | 1982 | Daughter of Alcinous who advised Odysseus | WGPSN |
| Neleus | 19.38°S 25.72°W | 37.6 | 2008 | Father of Nestor | WGPSN |
| Nestor | 54°S 64.81°W | 38.2 | 1982 | A wise old king | WGPSN |
| Odysseus | 32.82°N 128.89°W | 445 | 1982 | Hero of Odyssey | WGPSN |
| Oenops | 28.13°N 93.44°W | 25.7 | 2008 | Father of Penelope's suitor Leodes | WGPSN |
| Ormenus | 20.39°S 43.85°W | 39.8 | 2008 | Father of Ctesius | WGPSN |
| Penelope | 10.83°S 110.78°E | 207.5 | 1982 | Faithful wife of Odysseus | WGPSN |
| Periboea | 8°N 34.86°W | 51 | 2008 | Mother of Nausithous | WGPSN |
| Phemius | 11.32°N 73.78°E | 75.9 | 1982 | Minstrel to the wooers; spared by Odysseus | WGPSN |
| Philoetius | 2.32°N 175.29°E | 28.3 | 2008 | Faithful herdsman of Odysseus' flock | WGPSN |
| Polycaste | 1.38°N 86.41°W | 23 | 2008 | Daughter of Nestor | WGPSN |
| Polyphemus | 3.48°S 77.02°E | 73 | 1982 | Cyclops battled by Odysseus | WGPSN |
| Poseidon | 55.71°S 101.3°W | 63 | 2008 | Son of Cronos brother of Zeus god of the sea | WGPSN |
| Rhexenor | 75.63°S 65.22°W | 38 | 2008 | Brother of Alcinous | WGPSN |
| Salmoneus | 1.77°S 24.82°E | 93 | 2008 | Father of Tyro | WGPSN |
| Teiresias | 60.39°N 0.83°W | 14.5 | 1982 | Aged prophet; Odysseus consults him among the dead | WGPSN |
| Telemachus | 54°N 20.62°E | 92 | 1982 | Son of Odysseus | WGPSN |
| Telemus | 34.53°S 3.11°E | 320 | 2008 | Prophet of the Cyclops | WGPSN |
| Theoclymenus | 14.43°S 154.37°E | 34.3 | 2008 | Fugitive prophet given refuge on Telemachus’ ship | WGPSN |

back to top

== Thebe (1) ==
| Crater | Coordinates | Diameter (km) | Approval Year | Eponym | Ref |
|---|---|---|---|---|---|
| Zethus | 10°N 175°W | 40 | 2000 | Husband of Thebe in Greek myths | WGPSN |

back to top

== Titan (11) ==
| Crater | Coordinates | Diameter (km) | Approval Year | Eponym | Ref |
|---|---|---|---|---|---|
| Afekan | 25.8°N 159.7°E | 115 | 2008 | New Guinea goddess of creation and knowledge who teaches people how to live correctly | WGPSN |
| Beag | 34.74°S 169.55°W | 27 | 2015 | Celtic/Irish goddess of water education and knowledge. Anyone who drinks the water from her well will become wise | WGPSN |
| Forseti | 25.53°N 10.4°W | 145 | 2015 | Norse god the wisest and most eloquent of the Aesir | WGPSN |
| Hano | 40.3°N 14.9°E | 100 | 2011 | Bella Coola (northwestern USA and western Canada) goddess of education knowledge and magic. She manifested as a shaman so she could teach the people | WGPSN |
| Ksa | 14°N 65.4°W | 29 | 2006 | Lakota and Oglala (South Dakota USA) god of wisdom | WGPSN |
| Menrva | 20.1°N 87.2°W | 392 | 2006 | Etruscan goddess of wisdom | WGPSN |
| Momoy | 11.6°N 44.6°W | 40 | 2011 | Chumash (California USA) ancestor shaman and goddess of magic education knowledge health and healing | WGPSN |
| Mystis | 0.07°N 165.14°E | 20 | 2015 | Greek nymph a minor deity nurse of the god Dionysus who instructed him in the Mysteries | WGPSN |
| Selk | 7°N 161°E | 80 | 2008 | Egyptian goddess of knowledge writing education and reptiles | WGPSN |
| Sinlap | 11.3°N 16°W | 80 | 2006 | Kachin (N. Burma) wise spirit who dwells in the sky and gives wisdom to his worshippers | WGPSN |
| Soi | 24.3°N 140.9°W | 75 | 2012 | Melanesian (New Ireland Island Papua New Guinea) god of wisdom | WGPSN |

back to top

== Titania (15) ==
| Crater | Coordinates | Diameter (km) | Approval Year | Eponym | Ref |
|---|---|---|---|---|---|
| Adriana | 20.1°S 3.9°E | 50 | 1988 | Wife of Antipholus of Ephesus in The Comedy of Errors | WGPSN |
| Bona | 55.8°S 8.8°W | 51 | 1988 | Sister of the French queen in Henry VI, Part 3 | WGPSN |
| Calphurnia | 42.4°S 68.6°W | 100 | 1988 | Wife of Julius Caesar | WGPSN |
| Elinor | 44.8°S 26.4°W | 74 | 1988 | Mother of King John | WGPSN |
| Gertrude | 15.8°S 72.9°W | 326 | 1988 | Mother of Hamlet | WGPSN |
| Imogen | 23.8°S 38.8°W | 28 | 1988 | Cymbelline's daughter | WGPSN |
| Iras | 19.2°S 21.2°W | 33 | 1988 | Attendant to Cleopatra in Anthony and Cleopatra | WGPSN |
| Jessica | 55.3°S 74.1°W | 64 | 1988 | Shylock's daughter in The Merchant of Venice | WGPSN |
| Katherine | 51.2°S 28.1°W | 75 | 1988 | Henry VIII's first queen | WGPSN |
| Lucetta | 14.7°S 82.9°W | 58 | 1988 | Waiting woman to Julia in Two Gentlemen of Verona | WGPSN |
| Marina | 15.5°S 44°W | 40 | 1988 | Daughter to Pericles in Pericles Prince of Tyre | WGPSN |
| Mopsa | 11.9°S 57.8°W | 101 | 1988 | Shepardess in The Winter's Tale | WGPSN |
| Phrynia | 24.3°S 50.8°W | 35 | 1988 | Alcibiades' mistress in Timon of Athens | WGPSN |
| Ursula | 12.4°S 45.2°E | 135 | 1988 | Attendant to Hero and Beatrice in Much Ado About Nothing | WGPSN |
| Valeria | 34.5°S 4.2°E | 59 | 1988 | Friend to Vergilia in Coriolanus | WGPSN |

back to top

== Triton (9) ==
| Crater | Coordinates | Diameter (km) | Approval Year | Eponym | Ref |
|---|---|---|---|---|---|
| Amarum | 26°N 24.5°E | n.a. | 1991 | Quecha (Ecuador) water boa | WGPSN |
| Andvari | 20.5°N 34°E | n.a. | 1991 | Norse fish shaped dwarf | WGPSN |
| Cay | 12°S 44°E | n.a. | 1991 | Mayan deity | WGPSN |
| Ilomba | 14.5°S 57°E | n.a. | 1991 | Lozi (Zambia) water snake linked with destruction | WGPSN |
| Kurma | 16.5°S 61°E | n.a. | 1991 | Vishnu in the form of a tortoise | WGPSN |
| Mazomba | 18.5°S 63.5°E | n.a. | 1991 | Chaga (Tanzania) mythical large fish | WGPSN |
| Ravgga | 3°S 71.5°E | n.a. | 1991 | Finnish fortune-telling fish god | WGPSN |
| Tangaroa | 25°S 65.5°E | n.a. | 1991 | Māori fishing and sea god | WGPSN |
| Vodyanoy | 17°S 28.5°E | n.a. | 1991 | Slavic water spirit | WGPSN |

back to top

== Umbriel (13) ==
| Crater | Coordinates | Diameter (km) | Approval Year | Eponym | Ref |
|---|---|---|---|---|---|
| Alberich | 33.6°S 42.2°E | 52 | 1988 | Dwarf who guarded Niebelung gold also had a mantle of invisibility | WGPSN |
| Fin | 37.4°S 44.3°E | 43 | 1988 | Troll who helped build a church in Kallundburg Zealand | WGPSN |
| Gob | 12.7°S 27.8°E | 88 | 1988 | King of gnomes | WGPSN |
| Kanaloa | 10.8°S 14.3°W | 86 | 1988 | Polynesian chief evil spirit | WGPSN |
| Malingee | 22.9°S 13.9°E | 164 | 1988 | Aboriginal spirit who travels at night | WGPSN |
| Minepa | 42.7°S 8.2°E | 58 | 1988 | Macouas and Banayis evil spirit | WGPSN |
| Peri | 9.2°S 4.3°E | 61 | 1988 | Persian evil spirit who disguised malevolence by charm; disturbed natural elements and heavenly bodies | WGPSN |
| Setibos | 30.8°S 13.7°W | 50 | 1988 | Chief devil | WGPSN |
| Skynd | 1.8°S 28.3°W | 72 | 1988 | Troll who stole three wives of a man living in Englerup | WGPSN |
| Vuver | 4.7°S 48.4°W | 98 | 1988 | Volga Finn evil spirit | WGPSN |
| Wokolo | 30°S 1.8°E | 208 | 1988 | Baramba (West Africa) devil spirit | WGPSN |
| Wunda | 7.9°S 86.4°W | 131 | 1988 | Australian dark spirit | WGPSN |
| Zlyden | 23.3°S 33.8°W | 44 | 1988 | Slavic evil spirit | WGPSN |

back to top

== Vesta (90) ==
| Crater | Coordinates | Diameter (km) | Approval Year | Eponym | Ref |
|---|---|---|---|---|---|
| Aconia | 7.54°N 151.37°E | 19 | 2014 | Fabia Aconia Paulina; Roman aristocratic woman wife of Praetextatus (d. c. 384) | WGPSN |
| Aelia | 14.26°S 69.2°W | 4.34 | 2012 | Aelia Oculata; Roman vestal virgin (c. 83) | WGPSN |
| Africana | 68.99°N 14.13°W | 25.43 | 2014 | Cornelia Africana; Roman noblewoman wife of Tiberus Gracchus Major mother of Tiberus and Gaius Gracchus (c. 190-100 B.C.) | WGPSN |
| Albana | 76.61°N 159.31°W | 90.86 | 2012 | Roman vestal virgin | WGPSN |
| Albia | 27.85°S 78.85°E | 5.79 | 2014 | Albia Dominica; Roman noblewoman wife of Emperor Valens (c. 337–378) | WGPSN |
| Alypia | 70.22°S 139.22°E | 15.17 | 2014 | Roman noblewoman daughter of Anthemius and Aelia Euphemia wife of Ricimer (fl. 467–472) | WGPSN |
| Angioletta | 40.16°S 179.25°E | 18.42 | 2014 | Angioletta Coradini; Italian planetary scientist (1946–2011) | WGPSN |
| Antonia | 58.7°S 9.22°W | 16.75 | 2012 | Famous Roman woman daughter of M. Antonius and Octavia wife of Drusus mother of Germanicus Livilla and Emperor Claudius (36 B.C. - A.D. 37) | WGPSN |
| Aquilia | 49.41°S 169.12°W | 36.82 | 2012 | Julia Aquilia Severa; Roman vestal virgin (c. 218) | WGPSN |
| Arruntia | 39.44°N 138.41°W | 10.49 | 2012 | Roman vestal virgin (c. 70 B.C.) | WGPSN |
| Bellicia | 37.73°N 162.24°W | 41.68 | 2011 | Roman vestal virgin (c. 3rd century) | WGPSN |
| Bruttia | 63.81°N 122.91°W | 20.68 | 2014 | Bruttia Crispina; Roman Empress wife of Emperor Commodus (164–191) | WGPSN |
| Caesonia | 31.2°N 110.07°W | 104.23 | 2014 | Atia; Roman noblewoman, niece of Julius Caesar and mother of Emperor Augustus (85-43 B.C.) | WGPSN |
| Calpurnia | 16.72°N 10.9°W | 50.19 | 2011 | Roman vestal virgin (c. 3rd century) | WGPSN |
| Cannutia | 58.93°S 145.27°W | 17.97 | 2014 | Roman vestal virgin (c. 213) | WGPSN |
| Canuleia | 33.62°S 84.52°E | 11.32 | 2012 | One of the first Roman vestal virgins | WGPSN |
| Caparronia | 35.71°N 42.97°W | 53.2 | 2011 | Roman vestal virgin (d. 266 B.C.) | WGPSN |
| Charito | 44.8°S 90.71°E | 6.55 | 2014 | Roman Empress daughter of military commander Lucillianus wife of Emperor Jovian (mid 4th century C.E.) | WGPSN |
| Claudia | 1.65°S 146°E | 0.57 | 2011 | Roman vestal virgin (c. 143 B.C.) | WGPSN |
| Coelia | 1.14°S 120.18°W | 14.06 | 2014 | Coelia Concordia; the last Roman vestal virgin and the last Vestalis Maxima (Chief Vestal) after the Temple of Vesta was closed in 391 (d. 406 A.D.) | WGPSN |
| Cornelia | 9.37°S 15.57°E | 14.9 | 2011 | Roman vestal virgin (c. 23) | WGPSN |
| Cossinia | 0.63°N 178.96°E | 15.72 | 2014 | Roman vestal virgin | WGPSN |
| Domitia | 37.62°N 22.04°W | 32.99 | 2011 | Roman vestal virgin (c. 10–19) | WGPSN |
| Domna | 11.11°S 134.07°W | 13.53 | 2012 | Julia; wife of Roman emperor Severus | WGPSN |
| Drusilla | 15.05°S 51.22°E | 20.34 | 2012 | Julia; famous Roman woman second daughter of Germanicus and Agrippina sister of Gaius (16–38) | WGPSN |
| Eumachia | 0.14°N 42.94°W | 25.78 | 2012 | Priestess and prominent citizen of Pompeii (c. 1st century) | WGPSN |
| Eusebia | 42.04°S 5.69°W | 23.44 | 2012 | Famous Roman woman second wife of Constantius II | WGPSN |
| Eutropia | 22.4°N 104.99°W | 21.09 | 2012 | Wife of Maximian (c. 324) | WGPSN |
| Fabia | 15.53°N 55.76°E | 11.62 | 2012 | Roman vestal virgin (served as a vestal virgin from 73 to pre 58 B.C.) | WGPSN |
| Fausta | 25.44°S 99.76°E | 3.14 | 2014 | Flavia Maxima; Roman Empress wife of Constantine I executed by him (d. 326) | WGPSN |
| Flavola | 9.16°S 30.44°W | 2.87 | 2014 | Roman vestal virgin (c. 215) | WGPSN |
| Floronia | 36.23°N 94.06°E | 18.54 | 2011 | Roman vestal virgin (d. 216 B.C.) | WGPSN |
| Fonteia | 53.25°S 68.59°W | 20.61 | 2012 | Roman vestal virgin (c. 69 B.C.) | WGPSN |
| Fulvia | 26.13°S 67.35°W | 16.73 | 2014 | Wife of Clodius, Curio and Antony | WGPSN |
| Fundania | 57.62°N 74.98°W | 29.23 | 2014 | Annia Fundania Faustina; Roman noblewoman cousin of M. Aurelius victim of Commodus (d. 192) | WGPSN |
| Galeria | 29.82°S 18.38°E | 21.77 | 2012 | Galeria Fundana; wife of Emperor Vitellius (c. 1st century) | WGPSN |
| Gegania | 4.05°N 149.23°W | 22.33 | 2011 | Roman vestal virgin | WGPSN |
| Graecina | 37.45°S 122.99°W | 11.93 | 2014 | Pomponia Graecina; Roman noblewoman married to the consul Aulus Plautius (d. A.D. 83) | WGPSN |
| Helena | 41.51°S 87.45°W | 22.06 | 2011 | Flavia Iulia Helena Augusta; mother of Constantine the Great | WGPSN |
| Herennia | 72.42°S 10.33°E | 22.33 | 2014 | Herennia Etruscilla; Roman Empress wife of Emperor Decius mother of Emperors Etruscus Herrenius and Hostilian (c. 250) | WGPSN |
| Hortensia | 46.85°S 165.38°E | 29.45 | 2014 | Daughter of consul and advocate Quintus Hortensius (fl. c. 50 B.C.); she was known as a skilled orator | WGPSN |
| Iuinia | 35.58°S 121.78°W | 3.03 | 2014 | Roman vestal virgin (c. 107) | WGPSN |
| Justina | 34.41°S 107.88°E | 7.62 | 2012 | Famous Roman woman second wife of Emperor Valentinian | WGPSN |
| Laelia | 46.82°S 69.55°W | 8.89 | 2012 | Roman vestal virgin (c. 62) | WGPSN |
| Laeta | 14.9°N 30.1°W | 1.37 | 2014 | Clodia; Roman vestal virgin (c. 213) | WGPSN |
| Laurentia | 28.15°S 92.8°E | 11.48 | 2014 | Acca; mythical woman wife of the shepherd Faustulus in Roman mythology adoptive mother of Romulus and Remus | WGPSN |
| Lepida | 16.74°N 96.76°E | 42.9 | 2012 | Roman vestal virgin (c. 25) | WGPSN |
| Licinia | 23.34°N 167.35°E | 24.05 | 2012 | Roman vestal virgin (c. 140-113 B.C.) | WGPSN |
| Lollia | 37.36°S 117.67°W | 4.9 | 2014 | Lollia Paulina; Roman woman of distinguished ancestry and great wealth Roman Empress as the third wife of Caligula (15–49) | WGPSN |
| Longina | 36.96°N 20.65°E | 17.65 | 2014 | Domitia; Roman empress wife of Emperor Domitian Augusta of Rome (c. 51–130) | WGPSN |
| Lucilla | 75.96°S 60.88°W | 19.3 | 2014 | Annia; Roman Empress mother of M. Aurelius married to Emperors L. Verus and then to Ti. Claudius (c. 150–182) | WGPSN |
| Mamilia | 48.39°N 82.09°E | 35.67 | 2012 | Roman vestal virgin (c. 240) | WGPSN |
| Marcia | 8.98°N 20.45°W | 67.6 | 2011 | Roman vestal virgin (d. 113 B.C.) | WGPSN |
| Mariamne | 68.44°S 9.27°W | 30.33 | 2014 | Second wife of Herod king of Roman province Judea known for her great beauty (c. 60-29 B.C.) | WGPSN |
| Metrodora | 59.43°S 100.54°E | 23.99 | 2014 | Claudia Metrodora; Greek woman with Roman citizenship prominent public benefactor (mid 1st century A.D.) | WGPSN |
| Minervina | 16.85°N 160.71°W | 18.34 | 2014 | The first wife of the Roman Emperor Constantine the Great mother of Crispus (early 4th century) | WGPSN |
| Minucia | 20.2°N 2.8°W | 23.15 | 2011 | Roman vestal virgin (c. 337 B.C.) | WGPSN |
| Myia | 50.53°S 103.66°W | 2.59 | 2012 | Daughter of Pythagoras and Theano wife of Milon of Crotona | WGPSN |
| Numisia | 7.48°S 37.25°E | 29.94 | 2011 | Roman vestal virgin (c. 204) | WGPSN |
| Occia | 15.47°S 168.48°E | 7.34 | 2012 | Roman vestal virgin (served as vestal virgin from c. 40 B.C. to A.D. 19) | WGPSN |
| Octavia | 3.3°S 62.79°W | 30.62 | 2012 | Roman vestal virgin (third century A.D.) | WGPSN |
| Oppia | 7.89°S 99.08°E | 36.67 | 2011 | Roman vestal virgin (d. 483 B.C.) | WGPSN |
| Paculla | 64.22°S 151.15°E | 22.34 | 2014 | Paculla Annia; Campanian (Southern Italy) priestess of Bacchus whose reforms radically altered the Bacchanalian ritual in ancient Rome (fl. c. 188 B.C.) | WGPSN |
| Paulina | 10.92°N 133.11°E | 18.13 | 2012 | Aurelia; priestess for life of asylum-granting Artemis Pergaia built hydreion at her own expense | WGPSN |
| Perpennia | 23.03°S 101.25°W | 21.36 | 2014 | Roman vestal virgin (c. 100-70 B.C.) | WGPSN |
| Pinaria | 29.54°S 178.37°W | 41.76 | 2011 | Roman vestal virgin (c. 600 B.C.) | WGPSN |
| Placidia | 19.24°N 78.62°W | 14.75 | 2014 | Galla; daughter of the Roman Emperor Theodorius I wife of Athualf King of the Visigoths and Constantius III Roman Emperor (390–450) | WGPSN |
| Plancia | 61.56°N 16.09°W | 18.48 | 2014 | Plancia Magna; daughter of Roman Senator Varus wife of Tertullus benefactress and patron of Perga the capital of the Roman province of Pamphylia in Asia Minor (1st-2nd century A.D.) | WGPSN |
| Pomponia | 70.2°N 97.42°W | 59.07 | 2012 | Roman vestal virgin (c. 213) | WGPSN |
| Portia | 0.91°N 168.83°W | 11.44 | 2014 | Daughter of Roman statesman Cato Uticensis second wife of M. Brutus (c. 70-43/42 B.C.) | WGPSN |
| Postumia | 33.84°N 33.77°E | 195.89 | 2014 | Roman vestal virgin (c. 420 B.C.) | WGPSN |
| Publicia | 14.53°N 125.64°W | 15.79 | 2012 | Flavia Publicia; Roman vestal virgin (c. 213) | WGPSN |
| Rheasilvia | 71.95°S 86.3°E | 450 | 2011 | Rhea Silvia Roman vestal virgin mother of Romulus and Remus (c. 770 B.C.) | WGPSN |
| Rubria | 7.32°S 168.34°E | 10.27 | 2012 | Roman vestal virgin (c. 54) | WGPSN |
| Rufillia | 12.92°S 71.29°W | 15.79 | 2014 | Roman vestal virgin (c. 250–301) | WGPSN |
| Scantia | 29.63°N 64.65°E | 18.61 | 2012 | Roman vestal virgin (c. 40 B.C.-A.D. 23) | WGPSN |
| Sentia | 38.39°S 170.75°E | 16.54 | 2014 | Amaesia Sentia; mentioned by Valerius Maximus as an instance of a female who pleaded her own cause before the praetor; called "Androgyne" for having a man's spirit with a female body | WGPSN |
| Serena | 20.43°S 89.29°W | 18.47 | 2012 | Roman noblewoman niece of Emperor Theodosius (c. 400) | WGPSN |
| Severina | 75.41°S 88.45°W | 34.74 | 2011 | Roman vestal virgin (c. 240) | WGPSN |
| Sextilia | 39°S 64.07°W | 19.48 | 2011 | Roman vestal virgin (d. 274 B.C.) | WGPSN |
| Sossia | 36.78°S 75.76°E | 8.11 | 2012 | Roman vestal virgin | WGPSN |
| Tarpeia | 69.47°S 179.3°E | 40.29 | 2011 | Roman vestal virgin | WGPSN |
| Teia | 3.44°S 61.06°E | 6.69 | 2012 | Teia Euphrosyne Ruffina Roman vestal virgin (c. 200) | WGPSN |
| Torquata | 46.45°N 143.78°E | 34.73 | 2012 | Roman vestal virgin (c. 48) | WGPSN |
| Tuccia | 39.86°S 13.19°W | 11.65 | 2011 | Roman vestal virgin | WGPSN |
| Urbinia | 29.88°S 66.26°E | 24.25 | 2011 | Roman vestal virgin | WGPSN |
| Varronilla | 29.62°N 179.58°E | 158.45 | 2014 | Roman vestal virgin (c. 10–83) | WGPSN |
| Veneneia | 47.93°S 54.32°W | 400 | 2012 | One of the first Roman vestal virgins | WGPSN |
| Vettenia | 4.8°N 130.69°W | 18.89 | 2014 | Roman vestal virgin (c. 200) | WGPSN |
| Vibidia | 26.96°S 10.3°E | 7.1 | 2011 | Roman vestal virgin (c. 48) | WGPSN |

back to top

== See also ==
- List of largest craters in the Solar System
