= Jansha =

Jansha may refer to:

- Jansha (or Janshah), from The Thousand and One Nights
- Jansha (impact crater), named after the character.
