= Julnar =

Julnar

- Julnar, a character from Arabian Nights, also known as The Seaborn, the heroine of nights 738–756.
- Julnar of the Sea, ballet choreographed by Ted Shawn
- Julnar (ship), paddle steamer sunk in the Mesopotamian campaign
- Julnar (crater), named after the character
