= Musa (crater) =

Crater on Enceladus

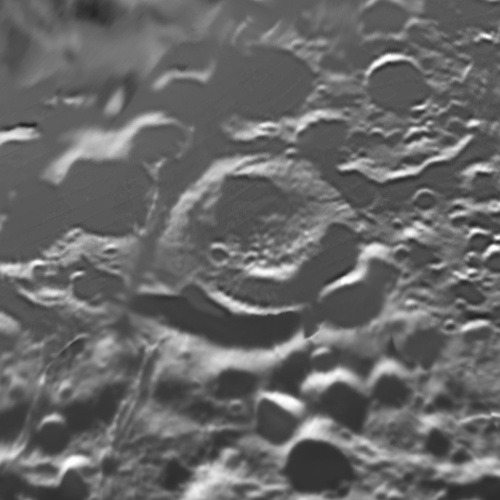
- Musa crater (center)
- Location: 72.42°N 17.58°W
- Diameter: 25 km
- Discoverer: Voyager 2
- Naming: character from Arabian Nights

Musa is a crater in the northern hemisphere of Saturn's moon Enceladus. Musa was first seen in Voyager 2 images. It is located at 72.4° North Latitude, 17.6° West Longitude and is 25 kilometers across. Musa is located North of Aladdin. A large, dome-like structure occupies the interior of the crater, suggesting the crater has undergone significant viscous relaxation. From Voyager 2 images, it also appears that Musa is superimposed on an older crater that formed just to the south.

Musa is named after a character from Arabian Nights. He goes to get the vessels that contain Jinni in "The City of Brass".
