= Salih (crater) =

Crater on Enceladus

Salih is a small crater near the sub-Saturnian point of Saturn's moon Enceladus. Salih was first discovered in images taken by the Voyager 2 spacecraft. It is located at 6.5° South Latitude, 0° West Longitude (IAU-defined longitude is 5° West Longitude) and is 4 kilometers across. Available images of this crater have too low resolution to determine anything about the geology of this crater.

Salih is named after the brother of Julnar in the Arabian Nights.
