= Naubolos (crater) =

Impact crater on Tethys

Coordinates: 72.19°S 305.18°W

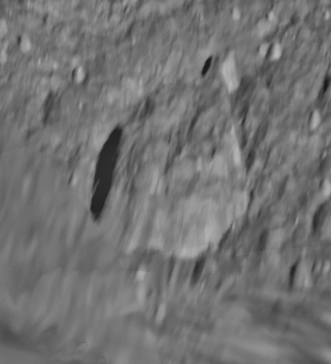
Naubolos Crater on Tethys, photographed by the Cassini probe

Naubolos is an impact crater on Tethys, one of Saturn's moons. Its diameter is 54 kilometers (34 mi). It is named after Naubolus, father of Euryalus in Homer's Odyssey.
