= Marjanah (crater) =

Crater on Enceladus

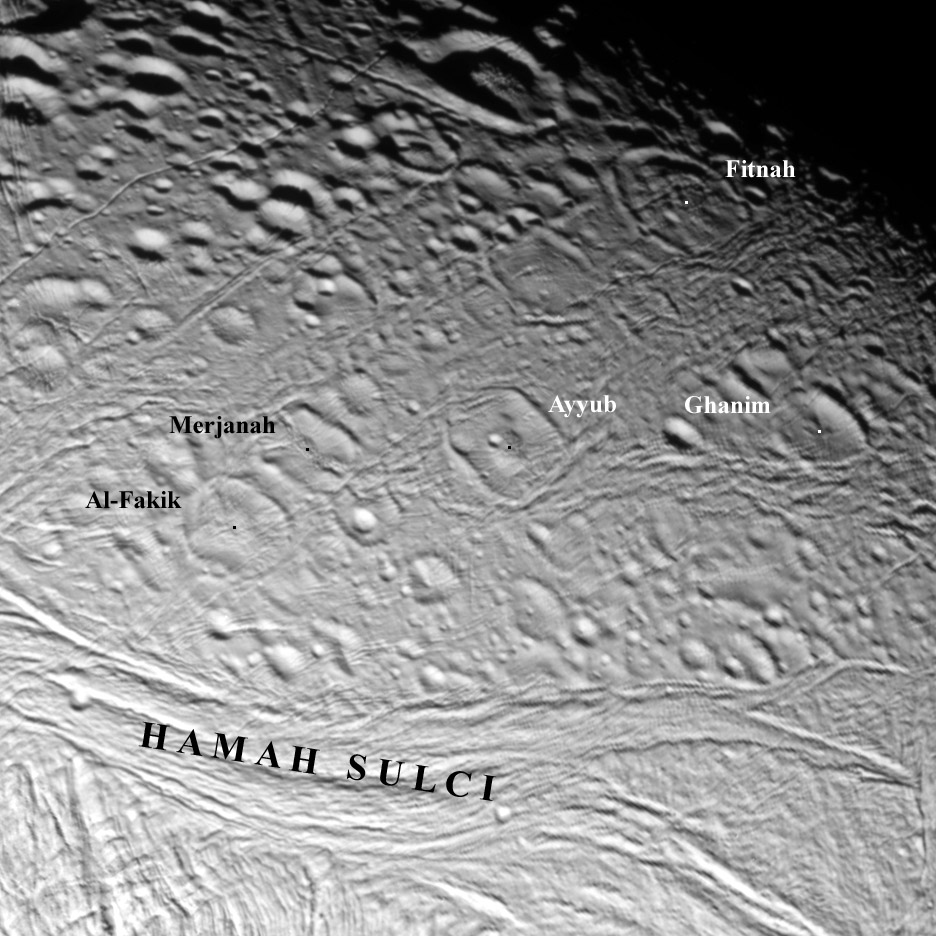
- Marjanah (center left) as seen by the Cassini spacecraft on February 17, 2005
- Location: 38.24°N 303.81°W
- Diameter: 14.5 km
- Discoverer: Cassini
- Naming: Marjanah; Queen

Marjanah is an impact crater in the northern hemisphere of Saturn's moon Enceladus. Marjanah was first observed in Cassini images during that mission's February 2005 flyby of Enceladus. It is located at 38.2° North Latitude, 302.8° West Longitude and is 14.5 kilometers across. The topography of the impact crater appears very subdued, suggesting that the crater has undergone significant viscous relaxation since its formation. In addition, fractures have disrupted the southeastern margin of the crater. The polygonal shape of the crater suggests that the collapse of initial, transient crater was influenced by tectonic faults in the area where the crater formed.

Marjanah is named after the queen visited by Bahram and his crew in "Tale of Kamar Al-Zaman" in The Book of One Thousand and One Nights.
