= Jansha (crater) =

Crater on Enceladus

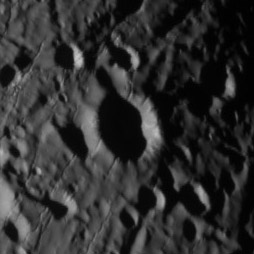
- Jansha (center) as seen by the Cassini spacecraft on July 14, 2005
- Location: 30.36°S 156.87°W
- Diameter: 9.8 km
- Discoverer: Cassini
- Naming: Jansha; heroine

Jansha is an impact crater on the southern hemisphere of Saturn's moon Enceladus. Jansha was first observed in Cassini images during that mission's March 2005 flyby of Enceladus. It is located at 30.4° South Latitude, 156.9° West Longitude, and is 9.8 kilometers across. Several of the southwest–northeast trending fractures that are prevalent in the region cut across Jansha, forming canyons several hundred meters deep along Jansha's rim.

Jansha is named after the hero in "The Tale of Jansha" (or Janshah) from The Book of One Thousand and One Nights.
