= Julnar (crater) =

Crater on Enceladus

- Voyager 2 view of Julnar crater
- Location: 52.79°N 350°W
- Diameter: 19 km
- Discoverer: Voyager 2
- Naming: The seaborn; heroine of nights

Julnar is a crater in the northern hemisphere of Saturn's moon Enceladus. Julnar was first discovered in Voyager 2 and has only been seen at comparable resolution by Cassini. It is located at 52.8° North Latitude, 350.0° West Longitude and is approximately 19 kilometers across.

Julnar is named after a character from Arabian Nights. Also known as The Seaborn, Julnar is the heroine of nights 738–756.
