= List of geological features on Tethys =

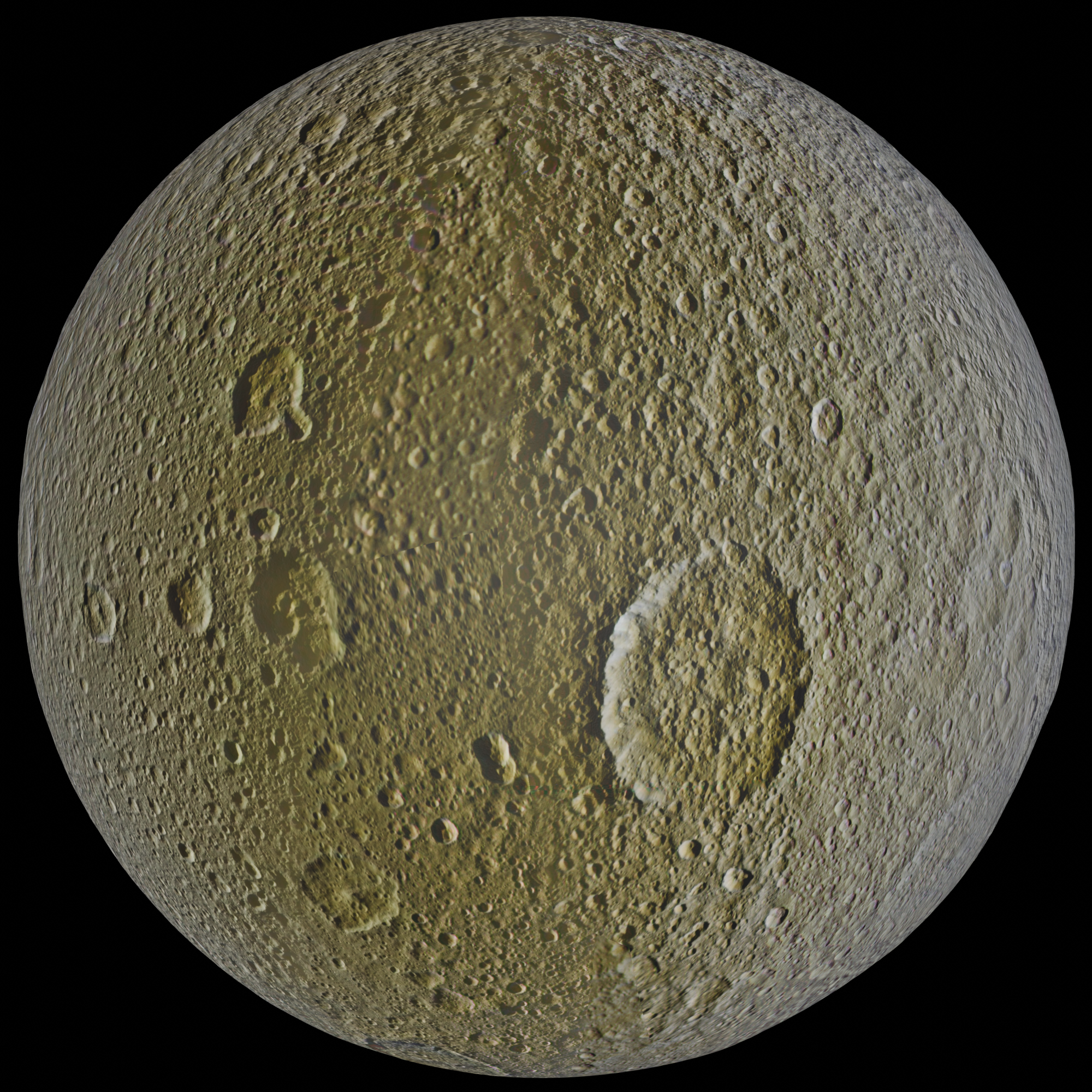
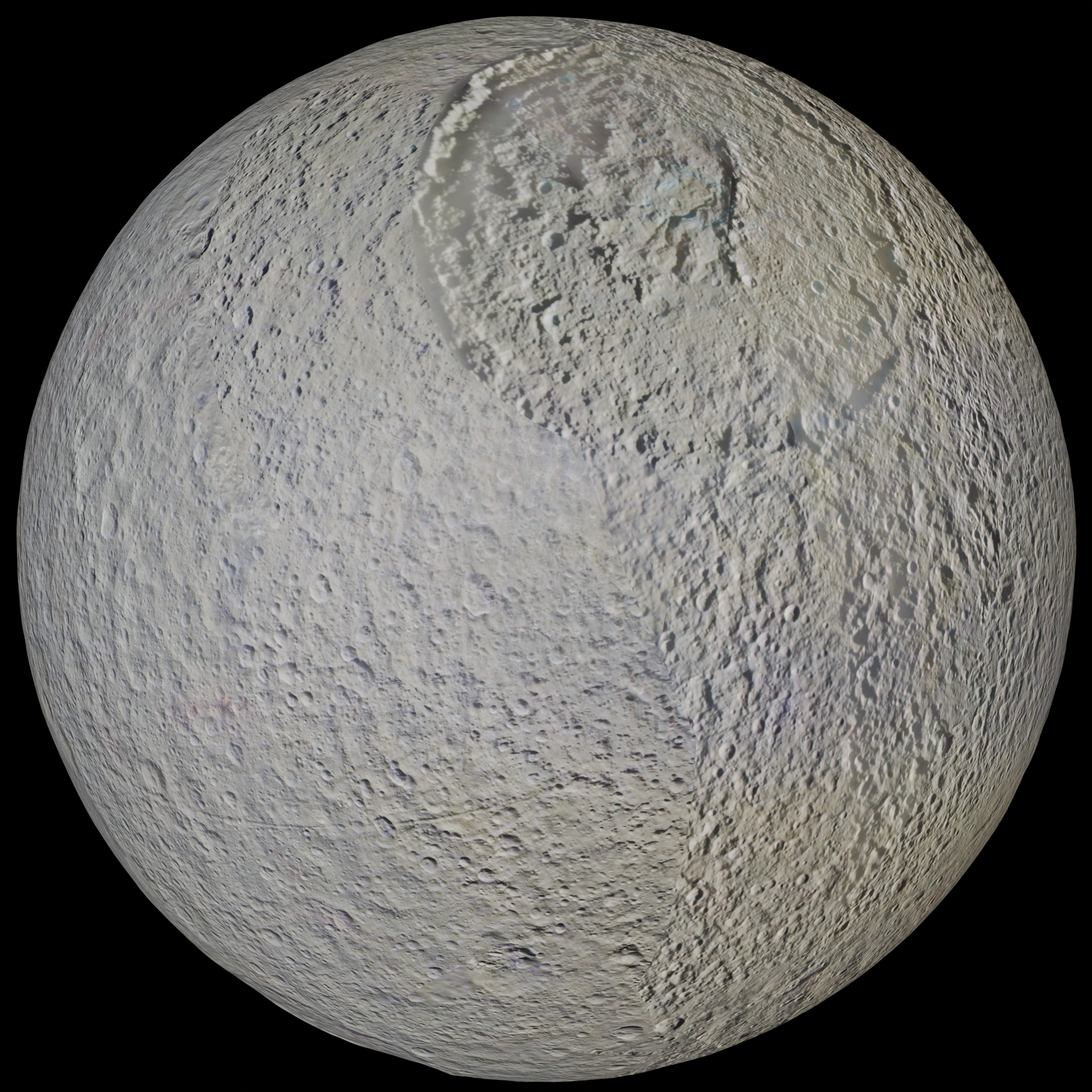

This is a list of named geological features on Tethys. Tethyan geological features are named after people and places in Homer's The Iliad and The Odyssey.

== Chasmata ==
There are two named chasmata on Tethys.

Chasma	Pronounced	Coordinates	Length (km)	Approval Date	Named After	Refs
Ithaca Chasma	/ˈɪθəkə/	14°S 6.1°E	1219	1982	Ithaca	WGPSN
Ogygia Chasma	/oʊˈdʒɪdʒiə/	56°N 95.2°E	120	2008	Ogygia	WGPSN

== Montes ==
The central complex of the Odysseus basin is called Scheria Montes.

Montes	Pronounced	Coordinates	Size, km	Approval Date	Named After	Refs
Scheria Montes	/ˈskɪəriə/	30°N 131°E	1859	2008	Scheria	WGPSN

== Craters ==
Crater	Pronounced	Coordinates	Length (km)	Approval Date	Named After	Refs
Achilles	/əˈkɪliːz/	0.6°N 324.38°E	58.4	2008	Achilles	WGPSN
Aietes	/eɪˈiːtiːz/	41.44°S 6.23°E	91	2008	Aietes	WGPSN
Ajax	/ˈeɪdʒæks/	28.41°S 282°E	88	1982	Ajax the Great	WGPSN
Alcinous	/ælˈsɪnoʊəs/	30.31°N 212.61°E	50	2008	Alcinous	WGPSN
Amphinomus	/æmˈfɪnəməs/	14.87°S 128.7°E	13.6	2008	Amphinomus	WGPSN
Anticleia	/æntɪˈkliːə/	51.31°N 32.37°E	100.7	1982	Anticleia	WGPSN
Antinous	/ænˈtɪnoʊəs/	59.89°S 286.15°E	138	1982	Antinous	WGPSN
Arete	/əˈriːtiː/	4.67°S 299°E	13	1982	Arete	WGPSN
Circe	/ˈsɜːrsiː/	12.6°S 54.66°E	79	1982	Circe	WGPSN
Demodocus	/dɪˈmɒdəkəs/	59.37°S 18.21°E	125	2008	Demodocus	WGPSN
Diomedes	/daɪəˈmiːdiːz/	38.12°N 289.42°E	48.57	2008	Diomedes	WGPSN
Dolius	/ˈdoʊliəs/	30.15°S 210.33°E	190	2008	Dolius	WGPSN
Elpenor	/ɛlˈpiːnɔːr/	53.43°N 263.69°E	60	1982	Elpenor	WGPSN
Euanthes	/juːˈænθiːz/	7.86°N 238.91°E	33	1982	Euanthes	WGPSN
Eumaeus	/juːˈmiːəs/	23.1°N 51.12°E	30	1982	Eumaeus	WGPSN
Eupithes	/juːˈpaɪθiːz/	18.71°N 171.21°E	22.3	2008	Eupithes	WGPSN
Eurycleia	/jʊərɪˈkliːə/	52.54°N 246.5°E	31	1982	Eurycleia	WGPSN
Eurylochus	/jʊˈrɪləkəs/	5.07°S 27.86°E	44.8	2008	Eurylochus	WGPSN
Eurymachus	/jʊˈrɪməkəs/	35.65°S 65°E	38.4	2008	Eurymachus	WGPSN
Halius	/ˈheɪliəs/	44.4°N 4.96°E	29.5	2008	Halius	WGPSN
Hermione	/hɜːrˈmaɪəniː/	38.4°S 148.69°E	68.2	2008	Hermione	WGPSN
Icarius	/aɪˈkɛəriəs/	5.89°S 305.85°E	54.4	2008	Icarius	WGPSN
Irus	/ˈaɪrəs/	27°S 244.81°E	26.5	2008	Irus	WGPSN
Laertes	/leɪˈɜːrtiːz/	46.36°S 67.46°E	51.13	1982	Laertes	WGPSN
Leocritus	/liːˈɒkrɪtəs/	21.53°N 118.66°E	12.5	2008	Leocritus	WGPSN
Leucothea	/ljuːˈkɒθiːə/	4.26°S 123.84°E	13.8	2008	Leucothea	WGPSN
Maron	/ˈmɛərən/	2.52°N 119.33°E	11.8	2008	Maron	WGPSN
Medon	/ˈmiːdən/	25.5°N 143.31°E	18.7	2008	Medon	WGPSN
Melanthius	/mɪˈlænθiəs/	58.5°S 192.61°E	250	1982	Melanthius	WGPSN
Mentor	/ˈmɛntɔːr/	0.25°N 44.16°E	62	1982	Mentor	WGPSN
Naubolos	/ˈnɔːbələs/	72.19°S 305.18°E	54.5	2008	Naubolos	WGPSN
Nausicaa	/nɔːˈsɪkiə/	84.4°N 5°E	69	1982	Nausicaa	WGPSN
Neleus	/ˈniːliːəs/	19.38°S 25.72°E	37.6	2008	Neleus	WGPSN
Nestor	/ˈnɛstər/	54°S 64.81°E	38.2	1982	Nestor	WGPSN
Odysseus	/əˈdɪsiːəs/	32.82°N 128.89°E	445	1982	Odysseus	WGPSN
Oenops	/ˈiːnɒps/	28.13°N 93.44°E	25.7	2008	Oenops	WGPSN
Ormenus	/ˈɔːrmɪnəs/	20.39°S 43.85°E	39.8	2008	Ormenus	WGPSN
Penelope	/pəˈnɛləpiː/	10.83°S 249.22°E	207.5	1982	Penelope	WGPSN
Periboea	/pɛrɪˈbiːə/	8°N 34.86°E	51	2008	Periboea	WGPSN
Phemius	/ˈfiːmiəs/	11.32°N 286.22°E	75.9	1982	Phemius	WGPSN
Philoetius	/fɪˈliːʃiəs/	2.32°N 184.71°E	28.3	2008	Philoetius	WGPSN
Polycaste	/pɒlɪˈkæstiː/	1.38°N 86.41°E	23	2008	Polycaste	WGPSN
Polyphemus	/pɒlɪˈfiːməs/	3.48°S 282.98°E	73	1982	Polyphemus	WGPSN
Poseidon	/pəˈsaɪdən/	55.71°S 101.3°E	63	2008	Poseidon	WGPSN
Rhexenor	/rɛkˈsiːnɔːr/	75.63°S 65.22°E	38	2008	Rhexenor	WGPSN
Salmoneus	/sælˈmoʊniːəs/	1.77°S 335.18°E	93	2008	Salmoneus	WGPSN
Teiresias	/tɪˈrɛsiəs/	60.39°N 0.83°E	14.5	1982	Teiresias	WGPSN
Telemachus	/tɪˈlɛməkəs/	54°N 339.38°E	92	1982	Telemachus	WGPSN
Telemus	/ˈtɛlɪməs/	34.53°S 356.89°E	320	2008	Telemus	WGPSN
Theoclymenus	/θiːəˈklɪmɪnəs/	14.43°S 205.63°E	34.3	2008	Theoclymenus	WGPSN
