= Androtion (disambiguation) =

Androtion can refer to a number of different people of classical antiquity:

- Androtion, a Greek orator
- Androtion (historian), a writer on history
- Androtion (writer), a writer on agriculture
