= Melanthius (disambiguation) =

Melanthius (Greek: Μελάνθιος) may refer to:

- Melanthius, a painter of ancient Greece
- Melanthius (tragic poet), a 5th-century BC Athenian tragic poet known only as a satirical target for Aristophanes in the plays Peace and The Birds
- Melanthius, an ancient Athenian historian of the 3rd or 2nd century BC; he wrote a history of Attica and a book on the Eleusinian Mysteries, of which only fragments remain.
- Melanthius (Odyssey), a minor character in Homer's Odyssey
- Melanthius, a character in the fantasy film Sinbad and the Eye of the Tiger
- Melanthius (crater), an impact crater on Tethys, a moon of Saturn
- Melanthius, a quadrangle of the moon Tethys

== See also ==
- Melantius
