= Melanthius (crater) =

Third-largest impact crater on Tethys

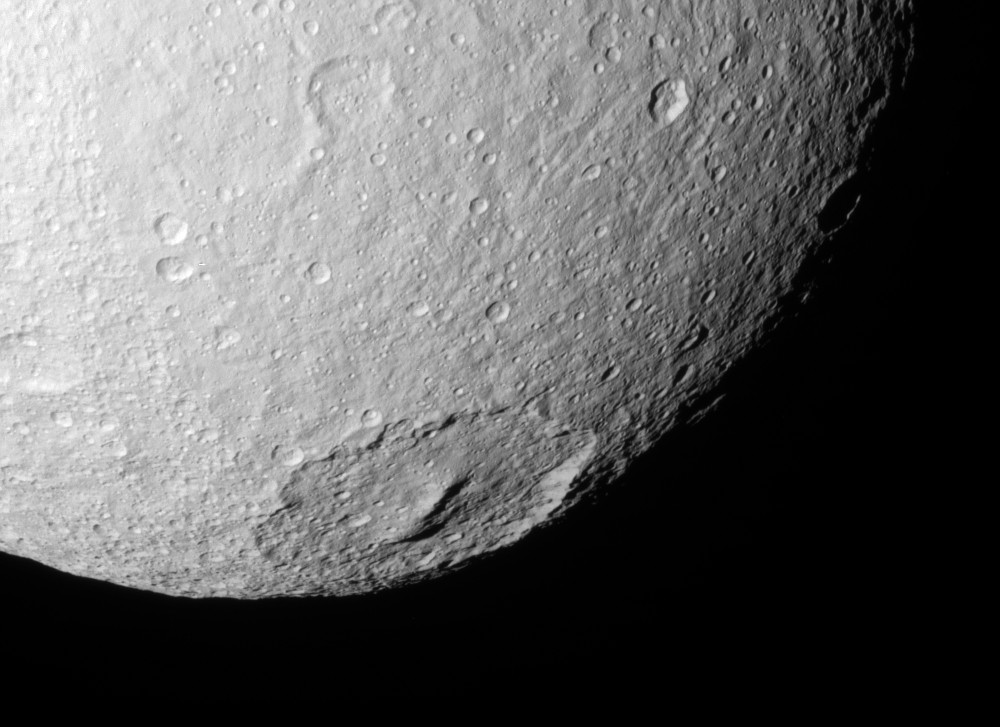
Melanthius on Tethys, photographed by the Cassini probe

Melanthius is the second-largest impact crater on Tethys, one of Saturn's moons. Melanthius is 245 kilometers (152 mi) wide, and is located in the southern quadrant of Melanthius, named after the crater. Melanthius is noted for its prominent cluster of central peaks, which were formed in the original impact. The crater is centered at 58.5°S, 192.61°W.

Melanthius is named after the character Melanthius, son of Dolius, who was Odysseus' disloyal goatherd in Homer's Odyssey.
