= Penelope (crater) =

Third-largest impact crater on Tethys

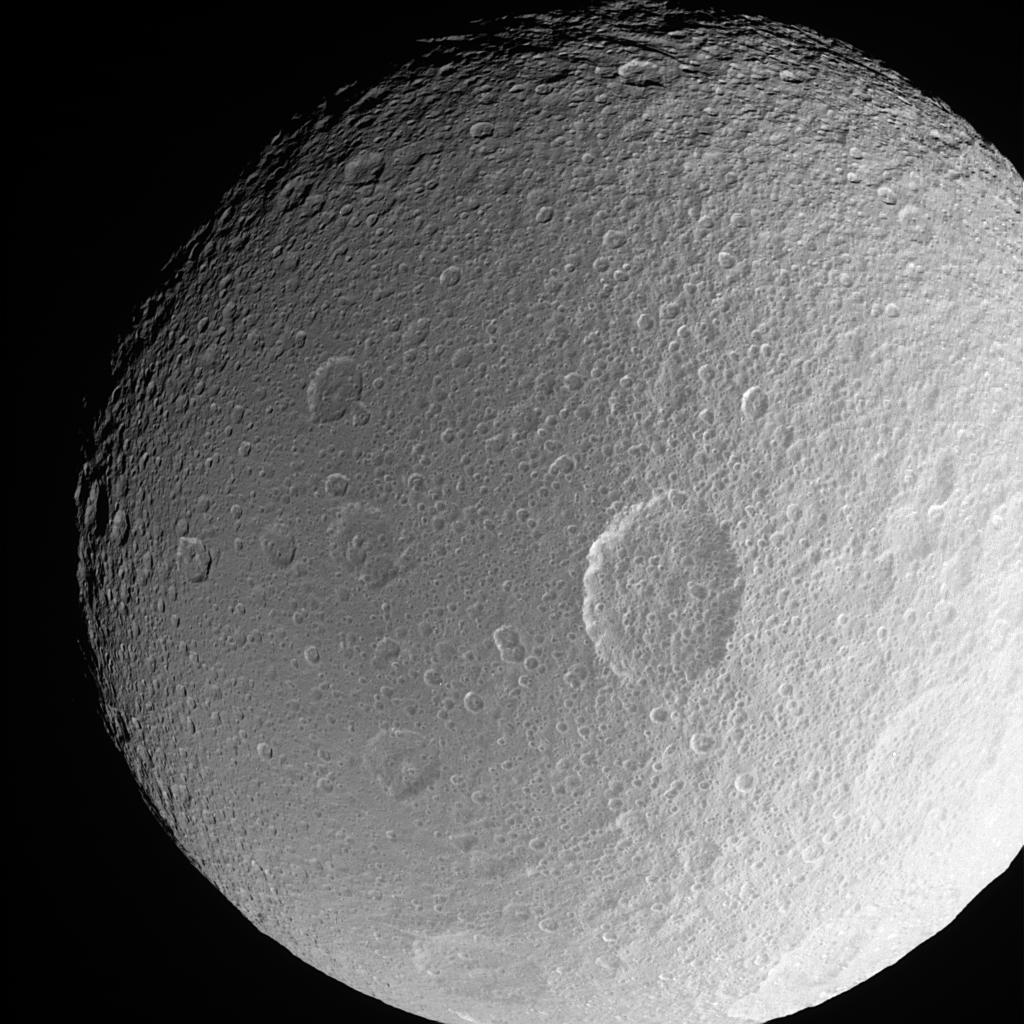
- Penelope crater (center)
- Feature type: Peak-ring impact crater
- Location: Tethys
- Coordinates: 10.83°S 110.78°E
- Diameter: 207.5 km
- Eponym: Penelope

Penelope is the third-largest impact crater on Saturn's moon Tethys. An unusually elliptical crater, it measures roughly 180 by 220 kilometers and is located near the equator near the center of Tethys's trailing hemisphere at 10.8°S, 249.2°W. It is approximately opposite to the largest crater on Tethys—Odysseus. Penelope is named after Queen Penelope of Greek mythology, wife of the legendary King Odysseus from Homer's Odyssey. The name was officially approved by the International Astronomical Union (IAU) in 1983.

== Geology and structure ==
Penelope is a highly elliptical crater, with its shortest axis being roughly 180 kilometers and its major (longest) axis being roughly 220 kilometers. Its longest axis is aligned almost exactly north–south, deviating by only 1°. With an average diameter of roughly 207.5 kilometers, it is the fourth-largest known impact structure on Tethys. Its western crater wall is bright, with fresh ice from Tethys's crust exposed; the eastern crater wall is comparatively much more degraded. Within Penelope's basin floor is a heavily degraded central peak ring approximately 50 kilometers in diameter. The central peak ring's northern and southeastern arcs are the best-preserved sections of this feature. Several faults cross Penelope, including a tectonic feature that crosses the basin floor yet does not continue beyond the crater rim. It is rather deep and unrelaxed, having not been flattened out as with some of Tethys's other major impact craters. It and another nearby unrelaxed impact basin, Antinous, may represent a province of unrelaxed craters between ~120° E and ~30° E.

The region Penelope is located in is dominated by heavily cratered terrain. To the east of Penelope is a network of roughly parallel narrow troughs that cut across a system of older, more degraded troughs. Regions to the east are especially densely cratered and rugged. Unusually, Penelope, alongside most of Tethys's other large impact craters, are all concentrated on Tethys's trailing hemisphere to the south of the equator.
