= Cleidemus =

Ancient Greek author (fl. after 479 BCE)

Cleidemus (/klaɪˈdiːməs/; Ancient Greek: Κλείδημος Kleidēmos) was a Greek author, perhaps of the fifth or fourth century BCE but definitely later than the battle of Plataea in 479 BCE, who produced a lost Atthis (Ἀτθίς), a local history of Athens dealing with the traditional origins of the city's law and institutions. Johannes Meursius suggested that "Cleidemus" is actually identical with the "Cleitodemus" stated by Pausanias to be the most ancient writer on Athenian history. Athenaeus and Plutarch make references to his works, all of which are lost.
