= Against Androtion =

Ancient Greek speech

"Against Androtion" was a speech composed by Demosthenes in which he accused Androtion of making an illegal proposal. This was the first surviving speech of Demosthenes composed on public charges (γραφαί, graphai).

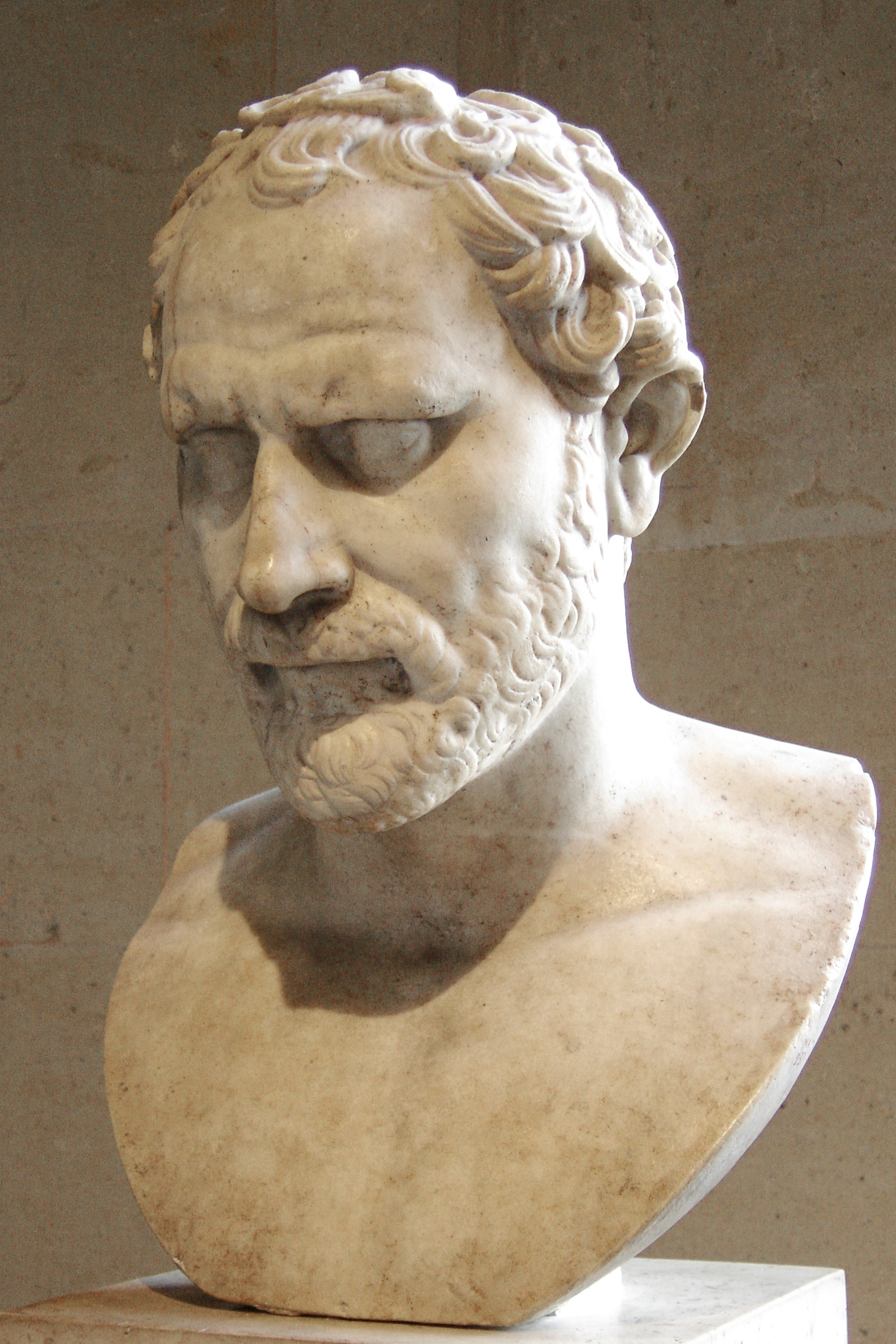
Bust of Demosthenes (Louvre, Paris, France)

The case was brought in 355/4 by Diodoros and Euktemon, and concerned Androtion's proposal that the council of that year be awarded a crown for their services. This was a customary award for the outgoing council every year, but the crown was only to be awarded to a council that had built a certain number of triremes that year. Despite the council of 355/4 BC having built no triremes, Androtion proposed that the crown should be awarded. After Androtion's proposal was passed, Euktemon and Diodorus brought a prosecution against Androtion claiming that the proposal had been illegal.

== Content ==
Demosthenes begins his speech by addressing the jury, and explains that Euctemon believes it is his duty to not only get satisfaction for his beliefs, but also to uphold the constitution, and that this speech is to do the same if the people feel he is up to the task. Demosthenes explains that as serious as the charges Euctemon has faced are, they do not compare to those Androtion has brought against him. Euctemon was the subject of a plot to get money from him as well as remove him from an office the people appointed him to. Androtion had accused Demosthenes of killing his own father, and accused Demosthenes' uncle of impiety due to their association with each other. He goes on to state he cleared himself of the charges in a court of jurors, but that if he had not he would have suffered greatly as not a single person would have dealt with him and no state accepted him. Due to these past charges, Demosthenes is attempting to avenge himself against Androtion.

The charge brought against Androtion is that he proposed that the current Council be rewarded by the people, however this reward is based solely on the construction of a certain number of triremes, which the Council had not built. Demosthenes, as well as Euctemon who initially brought up the charges, believes this to be illegal and that Androtion, as a skilled rhetorician, will maliciously attempt to trick and mislead the people. It is therefore his job to prepare the jurors against Androtion's tricks and responses. He believes Androtion will try to say that because the Assembly proposed the reward, and the people voted to pass it, there was no need for a preliminary decree. Demosthenes claims that this is illegal.

Demosthenes believes Androtion will then claim that all Councils that have received the reward in the past have received in the same way, but once again Demosthenes believes the contrary, and that if Androtion were right and the law has been broken in the past, it does not mean that he will allow the law to be broken now, but rather enforce it against Androtion first. If Councils in the past had been convicted of doing the same, Androtion would have never proposed the reward, and if Androtion is punished it will set a positive precedent in which future Councils will follow the law. The law plainly states that the Council does not have the ability to ask for a reward if they have not built the needed number of triremes.

Androtion claims it is not illegal as the Assembly is proposing the reward on other grounds, as the Council itself had not requested it, which if granted would make it illegal. Demosthenes cites two moments where it appears that the Council was expecting this reward without their construction of triremes. The Committee of the Council and the chairman put forward a series of proposals to vote on if the people believed the Council deserved the reward and called for a show of hands, but if they were not asking for the reward, they should have never raised the vote in the first place. The second is when Meidias, a political rival of Demosthenes, and others brought accusations against the Council, and the members of the Council quickly jumped up and begged for them not to be stripped of their rewards.

Demosthenes states the law on rewarding the Council is worded in such a way, that if the Council had not constructed the triremes, then they are not allowed to ask for the reward, and where this would be illegal, it too would be illegal to propose it if the triremes had not been built. The law is also written in a way beneficial to the people, that even if the Council had been satisfactory in all their other efforts, but had not built the triremes, they still can't be granted the reward. This is due to the fact that everything monumental in the history of Athens, has come from its armada of triremes, or lack thereof. Demosthenes mentions several times in history where Athenian ships have played a major part in its success: the great victory at the Battle of Salamis, as well as sending help to the Euboeans and ridding it of the Thebans by an armistice within days, as well as the victory against the Lacedeamonians, which seemed unattainable prior to the dispatch of triremes. He also mentions that Athens did not fall during the Decelean War until after the city's fleet was destroyed. Because of the weight that the triremes hold on the success of Athens, Demosthenes believes it is important the people refuse the Council a reward in order to make sure the Council and future Councils build the ships to protect Athens and its people in order to receive their rewards.

He believes Androtion, and the Council, could make the plea that the Council is not to blame for the lack of ships, but rather the treasurer who absconded with the money, resulting in a disaster. This is further shocking to Demosthenes, who sees the situation as Androtion trying to reward the Council with a crown for a disaster of a business deal, rather than success. It is the choice of the jury if they want to listen to excuses from those who have failed them, or if they want the construction of the ships. If the jury acquits Androtion and the reward is given to the Council, then it sets a precedent to every other future Council that they can expect their reward for not building the ships but still spending the people's money. However, if the jury rejects Androtion's proposal and the reward is not granted, then every future Council will then build the ships in order to receive the reward. The Council is fully responsible, according to Demosthenes, as they also appointed this treasurer themselves, rather than the people, who later stole the money without building the ships.

Demosthenes then says that Androtion is a very different kind of legislator from Solon, the Athenian statesman responsible for many of Athens' laws. He explains how Solon masterfully crafted the laws of Athens, and that it gives the people fair ways to go about rooting out crime and getting what they believe they deserve. Demosthenes then lists a large amount of the ways people can go about bringing a thief to justice. He then says to Androtion, that the people will use every method possible in order to make sure he pays for illegally proposing the law, and that he even had no right to propose the law in the first place, for a charge a prostitution had been levied against him and his father had cleared all of his debts.

He then goes on to list some arguments Androtion may use, and Demosthenes tells them this as a sign of warning, once again, to prepare them for his tricks and misdirections. Demosthenes then states that the Council as a whole is not at fault, and that Androtion should bear most of the blame for the illegal proposal, as if he had not proposed it, then the Council could not have been in this position to be rewarded the crown without the triremes. He then uses a counter argument to try to convince the jury that convicting Androtion alone would set a precedent of the Council following the law and doing everything as it was meant to be done.

In the chance someone tries to come and defend the Council, he issues a warning not to believe they are speaking in the benefit of the Council or the people, but only for their self-interest. If the jury convicts Androtion, they will be doing their duty and the will of the people will be upheld and the Council will have no other option than to defend its citizens first and foremost.

He goes on to describe Androtion's case against Euctemon, and how forced himself into the position of a tax collector, and then decided to completely change the way the taxes were being collected, despite putting it to the people to choose from three options. Demosthenes believes him unfit for life in the public eye, and a thief, and that he used Euctemon as a scapegoat in order to levy the taxes against the public and fill his pockets. Further describing Androtion's misdealings not only as tax collector, but further attacking his reputation, he has laid another charge on top of illegally proposing the Council a reward, prostitution, and bullying his way into Euctemon's position: being corrupt.

== Results ==
Androtion was acquitted, and continued to be active in Athenian politics at least until 347/6.

== See also ==
- Graphe paranomon
