= Melantius =

Melantius may refer to:

- Melantius (bishop of Toledo) (died c. 324)
- Melantius, bishop of the archdiocese of Rouen (589–602)
- a character in The Maid's Tragedy (1619)

== See also ==
- Melanthius (disambiguation)
