= Nausicaa (crater) =

Crater on Tethys, Saturn

- Feature type: Crater
- Location: Tethys
- Coordinates: 84.40°N 5.00°W
- Naming: 1982
- Eponym: Nausicaa, from The Odyssey by Homer

Nausicaa is an impact crater on Tethys, an icy moon of Saturn. Like most features on this moon, the crater was named after a character from The Odyssey, by Homer. Nausicaa was the daughter of Alcinous, she advised Odysseus. The name "Nausicaa" was officially approved by the International Astronomical Union (IAU) in 1982.

== Geology and characteristics ==
It is located in the northern hemisphere of Tethys. Its coordinates are 84.40°N 5.00°W.
