= Atthidographer =

In ancient Greece, Atthidographers (Ancient Greek: Ἀτθιδογράφος, atthidographos) were local historians of Attica. They wrote histories of Athens called Atthides (singular: Atthis). Atthidography is the best-attested genre of local history from the ancient Greek world, with fragments of more than fifty authors preserved.

The first Atthidographer was Hellanicus of Lesbos, and the first Athenian Atthidographer was Cleidemus. Other Atthidographers include Androtion, Phanodemos, Demon, and Melanthius. The last Atthidographer was Philochorus. The genre in which these authors worked is referred to as Atthidography.
