= Androtion =

4th-century BC Athenian orator

Androtion (Ancient Greek: Ἀνδροτίων, gen.: Ἀνδροτίωνος; before 405 – after 346 BC), was a Greek orator, and one of the leading politicians of his time. He was born between 415 and 405 BC, the son of Andron, who was a member of the Four Hundred and an associate of Theramenes. Androtion was probably Andron's first son, and seems to have inherited his fortune. In the late 390s or early 380s BC, he studied under Isocrates. He may have been the author of a work on agriculture which survives in fragmentary form.

Androtion began his political career not long before 385, and the first position we can place him as holding is that of epistates, some time in the 370s BC. Androtion held various other positions during his career, including governing Arkesine on Amorgos for at least two years up to 357–6, and being a member of the boule in 356/5 BC.

In 355–4, Androtion was brought to trial by Euktemon and Diodorus, accused of illegally proposing a crown be awarded to the Council of Five Hundred at the end of its term of office. The prosecution speech, composed by Demosthenes, survives as speech "Against Androtion", and it is a major source of information about his career up to this point. Androtion was acquitted, and was appointed as an ambassador to Mausolus, the ruler of Caria.

He is said to have gone into exile at Megara, and to have composed an Atthis, or annalistic account of Attica from the earliest times to his own days (Pausanias vi. 7; x. 8). It is disputed whether the annalist and orator are identical. Professor Gaetano De Sanctis (in L'Attide di Androzione e un papiro di Oxyrhynchos, Turin, 1908) attributes to Androtion, the Atthidographer, a 4th-century historical fragment, discovered by B. P. Grenfell and A. S. Hunt (Oxyrhynchus Papyri, vol. v.). Strong arguments against this view are set forth by E. M. Walker in the Classical Review, May 1908.
