= Androtion (historian) =

Androtion (Ancient Greek: Ἀνδροτίων) was a historian of ancient Greece. He wrote an Atthis, that is, a work on the history of Attica, which was frequently referred to by ancient writers. The fragments of this work have been published with those of Philochorus by Karl Gottfried Siebelis in 1811.
