= Ithaca Chasma =

Major valley system on Tethys

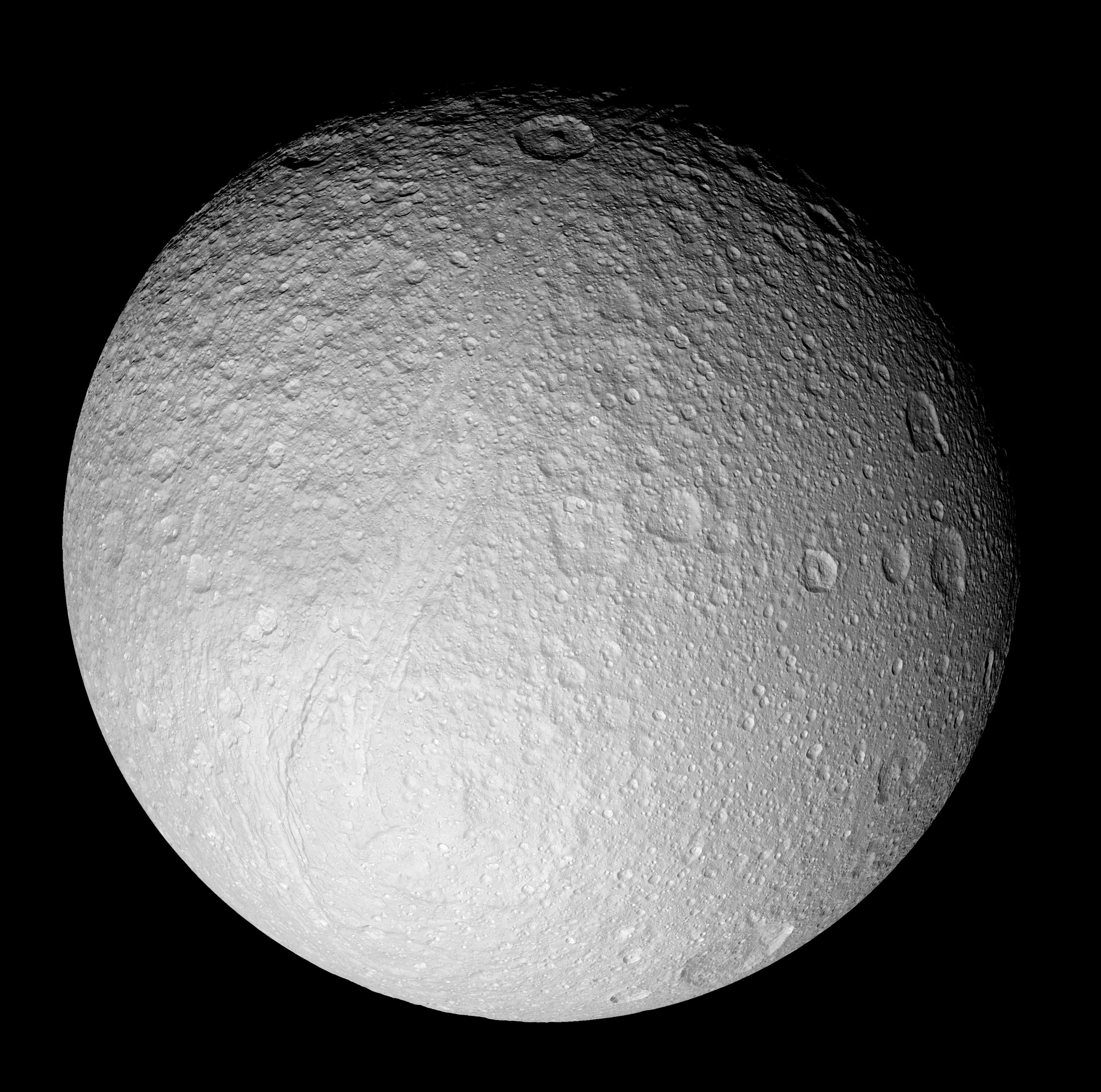
Tethys and Ithaca Chasma

Ithaca Chasma /ˈɪθəkə ˈkæzmə/ is a valley (graben) of Saturn's moon Tethys, named after the island of Ithaca, in Greece. It is up to 100 km (62 mi) wide, 3–5 km (1.9–3.1 mi) deep and 2,000 km (1,200 mi) long, running approximately three-quarters of the way around Tethys's circumference, making it one of the longer valleys in the Solar System. Ithaca Chasma is approximately concentric with Odysseus crater.

Ithaca Chasma may have originated when the global salt water ocean inside Tethys froze. This would have caused the surface to crack in order to accommodate the resulting increase in volume. Another hypothesis is that Ithaca Chasma is the outermost ring of the Odysseus impact basin; however the chasma is from 4 to 0.4 billion years old, making it slightly older than Odysseus.

== Discovery ==
Ithaca Chasma was discovered by Voyager 1 spacecraft on 12 November 1980 during its flyby of Saturn. However its full extent was realized only in 1981 after the Voyager 2 flyby. It was named after the island of Ithaca, in Greece.

== Geology ==
Ithaca Chasma is a giant trough system about 3 km deep and approximately confined to a great circle running through the poles of Tethys. It is approximately concentric with Odysseus impact crater—a pole of Ithaca Chasma lies only approximately 20° from it.

The chasma has a rather complex structure consisting of two narrow branches towards the south. Its exterior walls are made of multiple sub-parallel scarps and terraces. At some places the chasma has a rim standing as high as 0.5 km about the surrounding cratered plains. Its width varies from only a few kilometers at some places to more than 100 km.

The age of Ithaca Chasma is estimated to be either 4.0 or 0.4–3.3 billion years depending on chosen impact chronology. The crater counts indicate that the chasma is slightly older than Odysseus crater but much younger than the cratered plains.

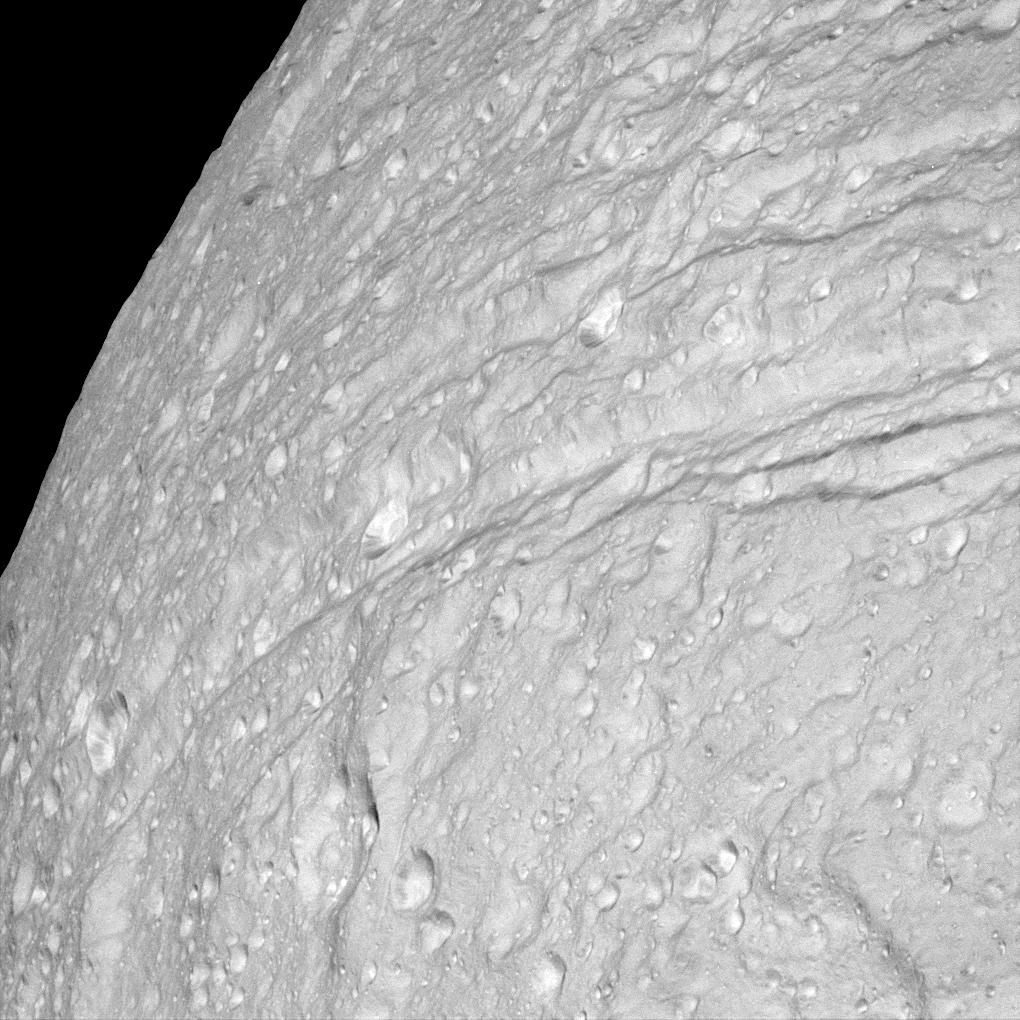
Cassini closeup of the southern end of Ithaca Chasma

== Origin ==
There are two basic hypothesis as to how Ithaca Chasma formed. One of them is that it formed as Tethys's internal global liquid salt water ocean solidified, causing the moon to expand and cracking its surface to accommodate the extra volume within. Earlier craters made before Tethys solidified were probably all erased by geological activity before then.

Tethys's global subsurface ocean may have resulted from a 2:3 orbital resonance between this moon and Dione early in the Solar System's history. The resonance would have led to orbital eccentricity and tidal heating that may have warmed Tethys's interior enough to form the ocean. Subsequent freezing of the internal ocean after the moons escaped from the resonance may have generated the extensional stresses that created Ithaca Chasma.

An alternative hypothesis is that it was formed at the same time as the large crater Odysseus which lies near a pole of the Ithaca Chasma. When the impact that created Odysseus occurred, the shockwave may have traveled through Tethys and produced a circumcircular fracture analogous to outer ring graben of multiring impact basins. However, age determination based on crater counts in high resolution Cassini images showed that Ithaca Chasma is older than Odysseus, making the impact hypothesis unlikely.
