= Dolius =

Character in Homer's Odyssey

In Homer's Odyssey Dolius or Dolios (Ancient Greek: Δολίος, romanized: Dolíos) is a slave of Penelope whom she had received from her father Icarius on occasion of her marriage to Odysseus. He served as a gardener.

== Family ==
Melanthius, Odysseus's goatherd, is mentioned as a son of Dolius, and Melantho is described as his daughter. His wife was a slave from Sicily, whose name is not given.

== Mythology ==
After Odysseus's identity had finally been revealed, Dolius heartily welcomed Odysseus in his home, expressing great joy to see his master alive and well. Later, he and his six sons were among the loyal servants who joined Odysseus to stand against the relatives of the slain suitors.

== See also ==
- 10989 Dolios, Jupiter trojan asteroid
- List of mortals in Greek mythology
