= Androtion (writer) =

Androtion (Ancient Greek: Ἀνδροτίων) was an ancient Greek writer on agriculture, who lived before the time of Theophrastus.
