= Melanthius (Odyssey) =

Character in Homer's Odyssey

Detail of a print by Theodoor van Thulden, Niccolò dell'Abbate and Francesco Primaticcio, depicting Melanthius threatening Odysseus, who is guided by Eumaeus

Melanthius (/məˈlænθiəs/; Ancient Greek: Μελάνθιος), the son of Dolius, is a minor character in Homer's Odyssey who is Odysseus's disloyal goatherd. In contrast, his fellow slaves, the cowherd Philoetius and swineherd Eumaeus, have both remained loyal to Odysseus during his twenty years of wanderings, as have Melanthius's father and six brothers.

== Mythology ==
Melanthius provides the best goats of the herd for a feast for the suitors of Penelope. He serves the suitors at the dining table, pouring them wine or lighting a fire in the hall upon their order. He is apparently favored by many of them: Eurymachus is said to like him best of all, and he is allowed to have meals in the same dining hall with the suitors.

Odysseus, disguised as a beggar and accompanied by Eumaeus, encounters Melanthius on his way into town, by the fountain dedicated to the nymphs. Melanthius immediately taunts Odysseus and proceeds to kick him on the hip, unaware that he is really dishonoring his master, causing Odysseus to consider attacking him. Later, when Odysseus is brought in front of the suitors, Melanthius asserts that he knows nothing of the stranger and that Eumaeus alone is responsible for bringing him in. His speech results in the suitors' rebuking Eumaeus.

Early in the fight with the suitors, Eumaeus and Philoetius catch Melanthius trying to steal more weapons and armour for the suitors. On Odysseus's orders, they bind him and string him up from the rafters, where he is mocked by Eumaeus. After winning the fight, Telemachus (the son of Odysseus), Eumaeus, and Philoetius hang the twelve slaves, including Melanthius's sister Melantho. Melanthius is then taken to the inner court, where individuals chop off his nose and ears with a sword, pull off his genitals to feed to the dogs, and then, in their fury, chop off his hands and feet.

According to Malcolm Davies of St. John's College, Oxford, the text does not specify who mutilates Melanthius. Rick Newton of Kent State University stated that "there is no indication" that Telemachus did not participate in Melanthius's execution, and whether Odysseus asked the three to kill Melanthius is not "explicitly" answered. Newton identified Eumaeus and Philoetius as being among the participants of the mutilation. The text does not explicitly state that Melanthius succumbs to those injuries. Davies stated that he believed that Melanthius survives the injuries. According to Davies, the nature of Melanthius's mutilation shows his low social status, compared to the more noble deaths of the suitors. According to Davies, Melanthius becomes a "living corpse", facing "ridicule", resulting from a "ghastly and humiliating punishment". Newton states that Melanthius dies from his injuries, and that the mutilation is an "execution". A Dictionary of Greek and Roman biography and mythology, edited by William Smith, stated that Odysseus was responsible for Melanthius's death, and that said death was done "cruelly". Mark Buchan, in Ramus, stated that Melanthius dies and that the mutilation of the hands and feet as well as that of the penis all show symbolism; Buchan argued that the former body parts are used in combat and the latter part is a "more obvious expression of his manhood".

== Namesake ==
- 12973 Melanthios, a Jovian asteroid
