= Dalilah =

Dalilah or Dalila (Arabic: دليلة) is a feminine given name, a variant of the Hebrew name Delilah. It may refer to:

== Dalila ==
=== Given name ===
- Dalila Abdulkadir (born 1998), Bahraini long-distance runner
- Dalila Argaez Wendlandt (born 1969), American lawyer
- Dalila Bela (born 2001), Canadian-American actress
- Dalila Boudjemaa, Algerian agricultural engineer and politician
- Dalila Carmo (born 1974), Portuguese actress
- Dalila Di Lazzaro (born 1953), Italian model, actress and writer
- Dalila Ennadre (196–2020), Moroccan film director
- Dalila Ippólito (born 2002), Argentine footballer
- Dalila Jakupović (born 1991), Slovenian tennis player of Bosnian descent
- Dalila Meftahi (born 1960), Tunisian actress
- Dalila Méhira, retired Algerian runner
- Dalila Mirabella (born 1994), Italian field hockey player
- Dalila Paola Méndez (born 1975), American visual artist of Guatemalan-Nicaraguan-Salvadoran descent
- Dalila Palma (born 1999), Cuban volleyball player
- Dalila Puzzovio (born 1943), Argentine visual artist and fashion designer
- Dalila Rodrigues (born 1961), Portuguese art historian and politician
- Dalila Rodríguez Hernandez (born 1988), Cuban track cyclist
- Dalila Rugama (born 1984), Nicaraguan javelin thrower
- Dalila Spiteri (born 1997), Italian tennis player
- Dalila Zerrouki (born 1982), Algerian football manager and retired player
- Zakiya Dalila Harris (born 1992), American author

=== Surname ===
- Aref Dalila (born 1942), Syrian economist

=== Other uses ===
- Dalila (film), a 1956 Egyptian film
- List of storms named Dalila
- Sansão e Dalila, a Brazilian miniseries

== Dalilah ==
=== Given name ===
- Dalilah (bellydancer) (1936–2001), Spanish oriental dancer
- Dalilah Muhammad (born 1990), American track and field athlete
- Dalilah Sappenfield, American former figure skating coach and choreographer

=== Other uses ===
- Dalilah (crater), a crater in the northern hemisphere of Saturn's moon Enceladus
- Dalilah the Crafty, a character in One Thousand and One Nights

== See also ==
- Dalida (given name)
- Delilah (disambiguation)
