= Dalida (given name) =

Dalida (Ancient Greek: Δαλιδά; Arabic: داليدا) is a feminine given name of Hebrew origin, the Greek form of Delilah. Notable people with the given name include:

- Dalida (1933–1987), Italian-French singer and actress
- Dalida Khalil (born 1988), Lebanese actress and singer
- Dalida María Benfield, Panamanian-American media artist, researcher and writer

== See also ==
- Dalilah (disambiguation)
- Delilah (disambiguation)
