= Delilah (disambiguation) =

Delilah is a female Biblical figure.

Delilah, or Delila, also may refer to:

== Places ==
- Delila, Virginia, United States

== People ==
- Delilah (given name)
- Delila Hatuel (born 1980), Israeli fencer
- Delila Richards Abbott (1908–1998), American politician and businesswoman
- Maya Delilah (born 2000), English singer-songwriter and guitarist
- Sophie Delila (born 1983), French songwriter, musician and producer
- Paloma Ayana Stoecker (born 1991), known mononymously as Delilah, English singer-songwriter

== Arts and entertainment ==
=== Music ===
- Delilah (Tom Jones album), 1968
- Delilah (Anderson East album), 2015
- "Delilah" (Florence and the Machine song), 2015
- "Delilah" (Queen song), 1991
- "Delilah" (Tom Jones song), 1968
- "Delilah", a song by The Cranberries from Bury the Hatchet
- "Delilah", a song by The Dresden Dolls from the 2006 album Yes, Virginia...
- "Delilah", a song by Mavado
- "Delilah", a jazz standard based on the theme song to the 1949 film Samson and Delilah by Victor Young, featured on the 1954 album Clifford Brown & Max Roach

=== Books and television ===
- Delilah (novel), a 1941 novel by Marcus Goodrich revolving around a fictional US Navy destroyer named Delilah
- Delilah (American TV series)
- Delilah (Canadian TV series), a 1973–1974 Canadian sitcom
- Delilah (comics), a Marvel Comics character, an enemy of Spider-Man
- Del Dingle (Delilah "Del" Dingle), a fictional character in the British soap opera Emmerdale
- Delilah, in the animated series Delilah & Julius
- Delilah, a horse in the TV series Steptoe and Son
- Delilah, a character in works by American novelist Barry Eisler

== Technology ==
- Delilah (missile), developed by Israel Military Industries
- Delilah, a secure speech device co-developed by Alan Turing
- Delilah, nickname of the Norsk Data ND-120/CX processor

== Other uses ==
- Delilah (beetle), a genus of longhorn beetles
- Xenox delila, a species of bee flies
- White Lady (cocktail), also known as a Delilah
- 560 Delila, an asteroid
- List of storms named Delilah

== See also ==
- Dalilah (disambiguation)
- Delilia, a genus of flowering plants
