= Delilah (given name) =

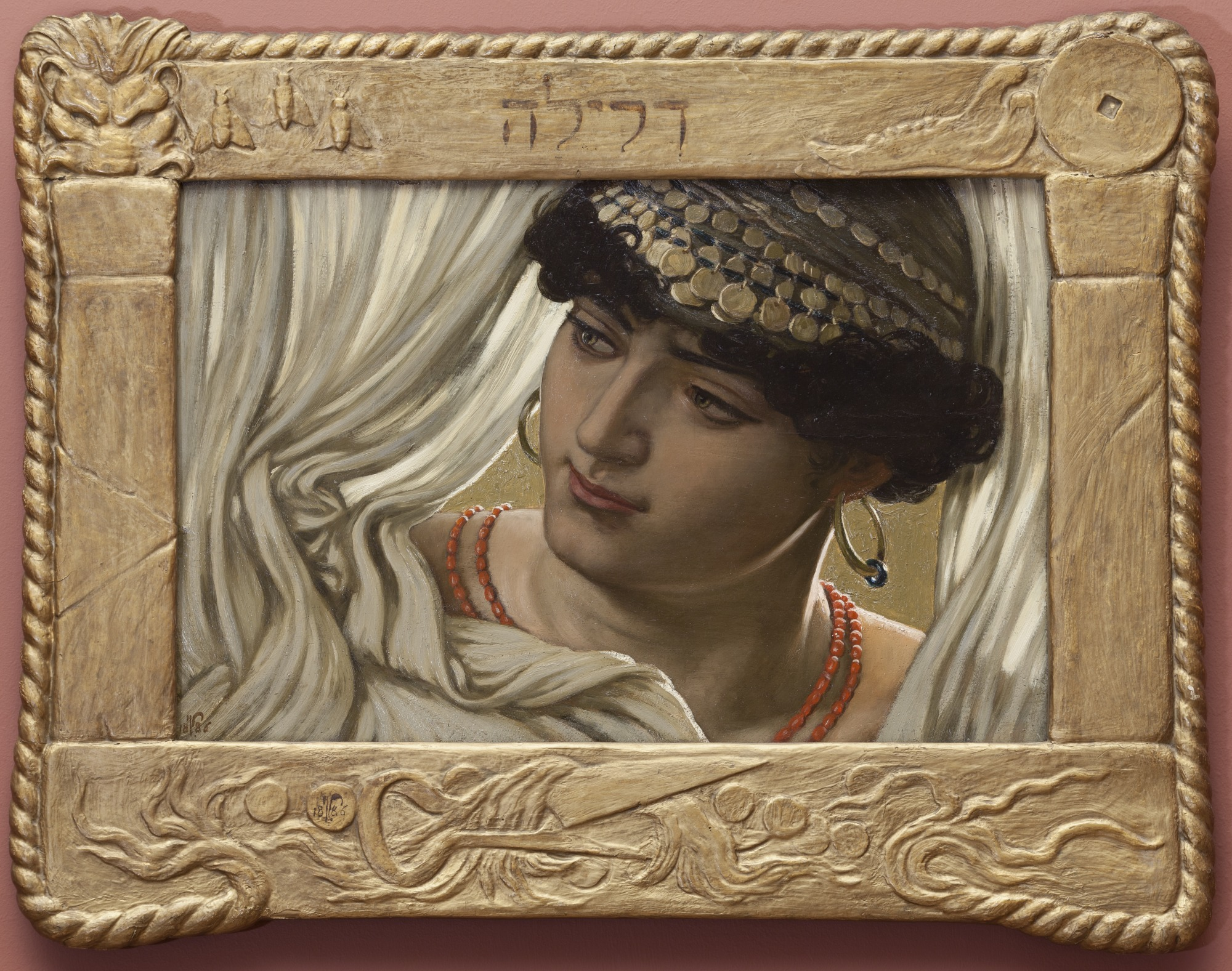
- Delilah by Elihu Vedder
- Pronunciation: /dɪˈlaɪlə/ dil-EYE-lə
- Gender: Feminine

Origin
- Language: Hebrew

Other names
- Variant forms: Delila, Dalila, Dalilah, Dalida

Delilah is a feminine given name of uncertain meaning. The best known Delilah is the Biblical character.

The name has been in use in the United States and United Kingdom since the mid-1600s. The increase in the usage of the name in the Anglosphere has been attributed to the influence of the 2006 popular song "Hey There Delilah" by the Plain White T's as well as its similarity in sound to other currently popular names such as Leila, Lila, and Lily. Another source notes its similarity in sound to the etymologically unrelated words delightful and lilac.

== Usage ==
It has been among the top one thousand names used for girls in the United States since 1997 and among the one hundred most used names for American girls since 2018. It has been among the five hundred most used for girls in England and Wales since 2008 and among the top one hundred names for girls since 2018. The variant Dalila was among the most popular names for newborn girls in 2021 in Bosnia and Herzegovina.

== Notable people ==
- Delilah (radio host) (born 1960), full name Delilah Rene, American radio personality
- Delilah (musician) (born 1991), stage name of Paloma Ayana Stoecker, English singer-songwriter
- Delilah Asiago (born 1972), Kenyan retired athlete
- Delilah Beasley (1867–1934), American historian and newspaper columnis
- Delilah Bon (born 1997), stage name of Lauren Tate, English vocalist, songwriter and producer
- Delilah S. Dawson (born 1977), American fantasy and science fiction writer
- Delilah DiCrescenzo (born 1983), American distance runner
- Delilah Gore (born 1962), Papua New Guinean politician
- Delilah Jackson (1929–2013), American cultural historian
- Delilah Lobo (born 1977), Indian politician and businesswoman
- Delilah Montoya (born 1955), American contemporary artist and educator
- Delilah Pierce (1904–1992), African-American artist, curator, and educator

== See also ==
- List of storms named Delilah
- Dalilah
- Dalida (given name)
