= 1988–89 South Pacific cyclone season =

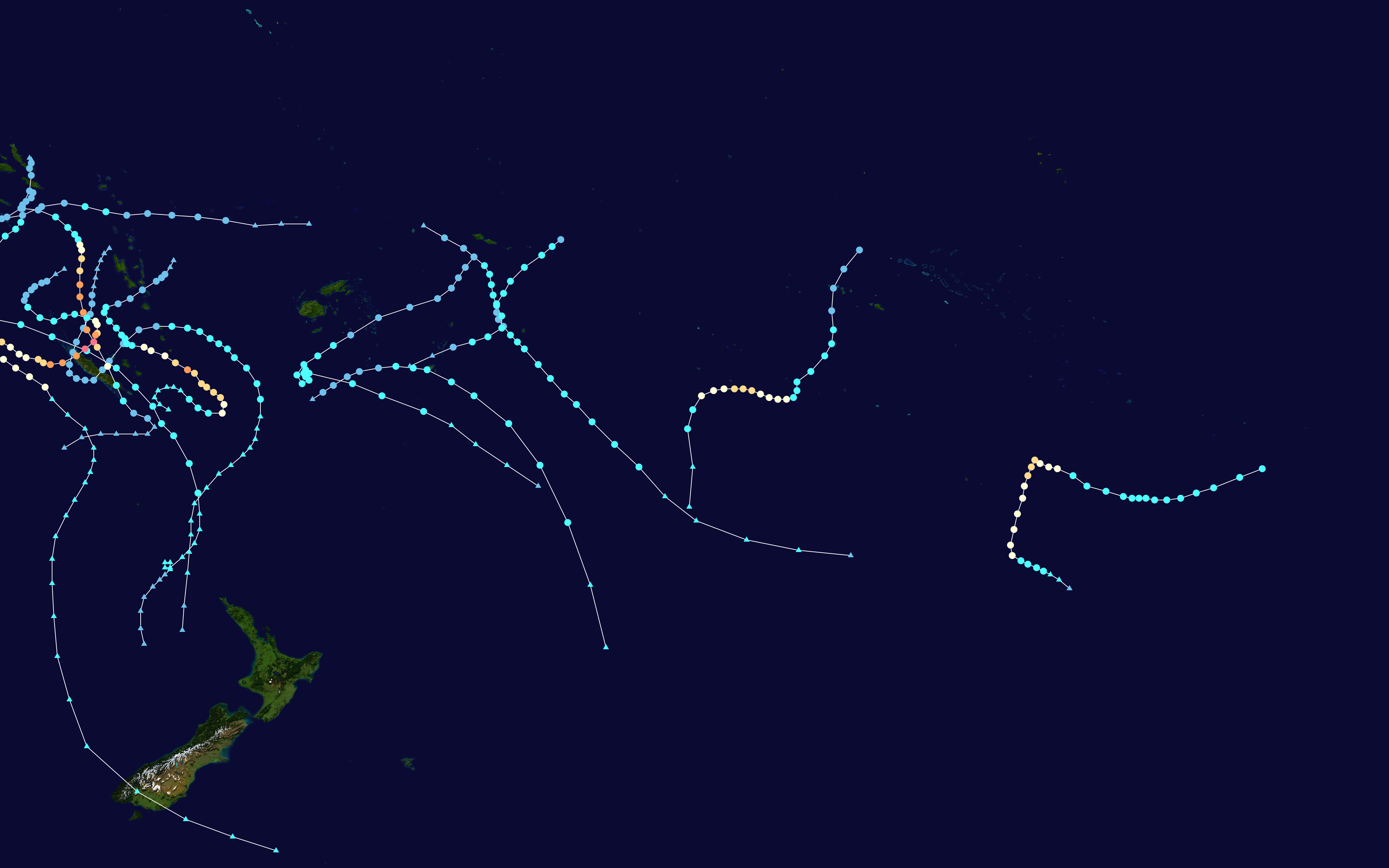
- Season summary map

Seasonal boundaries
- First system formed: December 15, 1988
- Last system dissipated: May 30, 1989

Strongest storm
- Name: Harry
  - Maximum winds: 185 km/h (115 mph) (10-minute sustained)
  - Lowest pressure: 925 hPa (mbar)

Seasonal statistics
- Total depressions: 15
- Tropical cyclones: 12
- Severe tropical cyclones: 5
- Total fatalities: 2
- Total damage: $5 million (1989 USD)

Related articles
- 1988–89 South-West Indian Ocean cyclone season; 1988–89 Australian region cyclone season

The 1988–89 South Pacific cyclone season was an active tropical cyclone season with an above average number of tropical cyclones observed.

== Seasonal summary ==
During the season despite positive values of the Southern Oscillation Index being recorded throughout the season, there was an unusual distribution of tropical cyclones with five developing between 180° and 140°W. This unusual distribution of tropical cyclones was attributed to the relatively rapid development of an active South Pacific Convergence Zone over an area of cooler than normal sea surface temperatures during January and February 1989.

== Systems ==
=== Tropical Cyclone Eseta ===
- Category 2 tropical cyclone (Australian scale)
- Tropical storm (SSHWS)
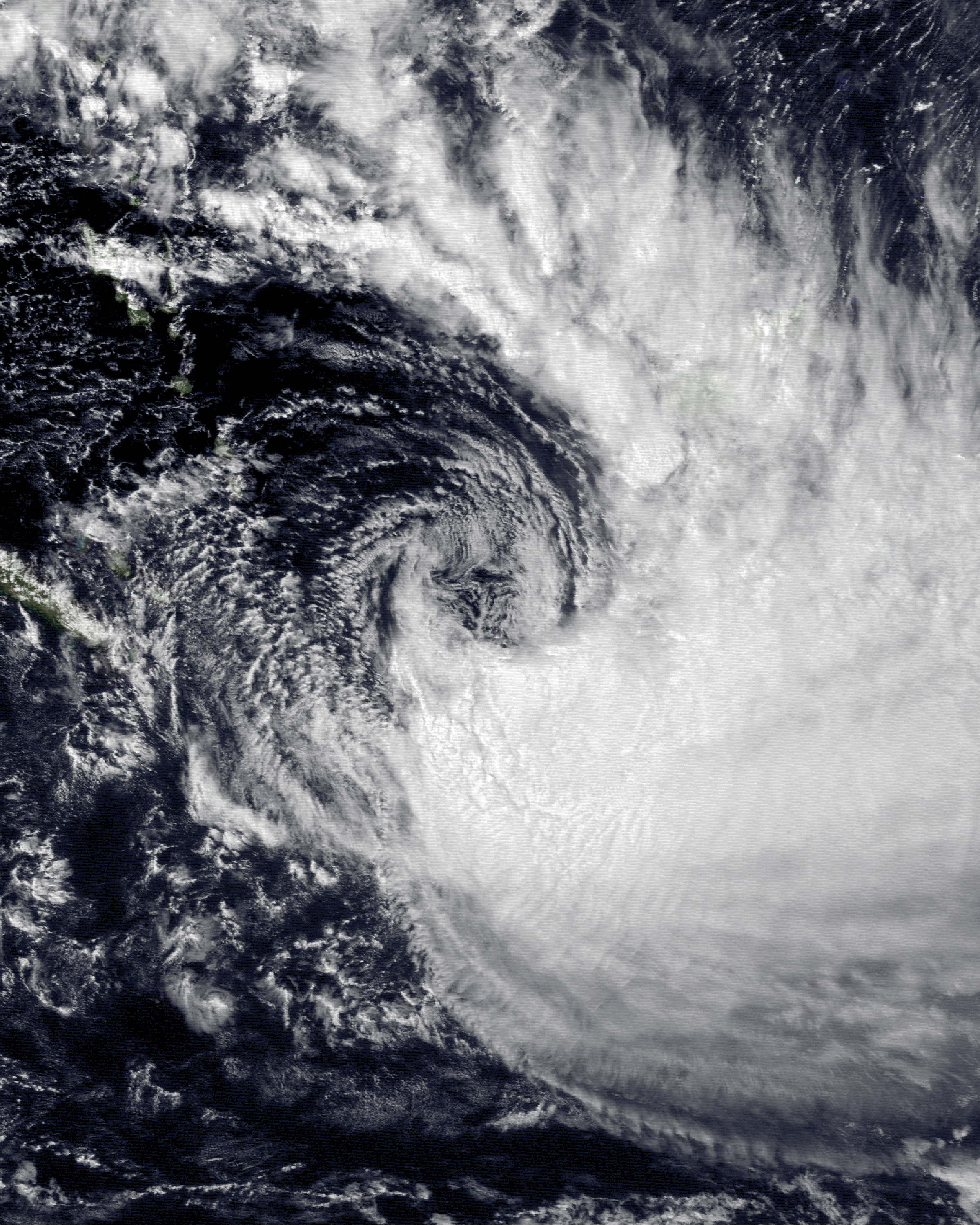
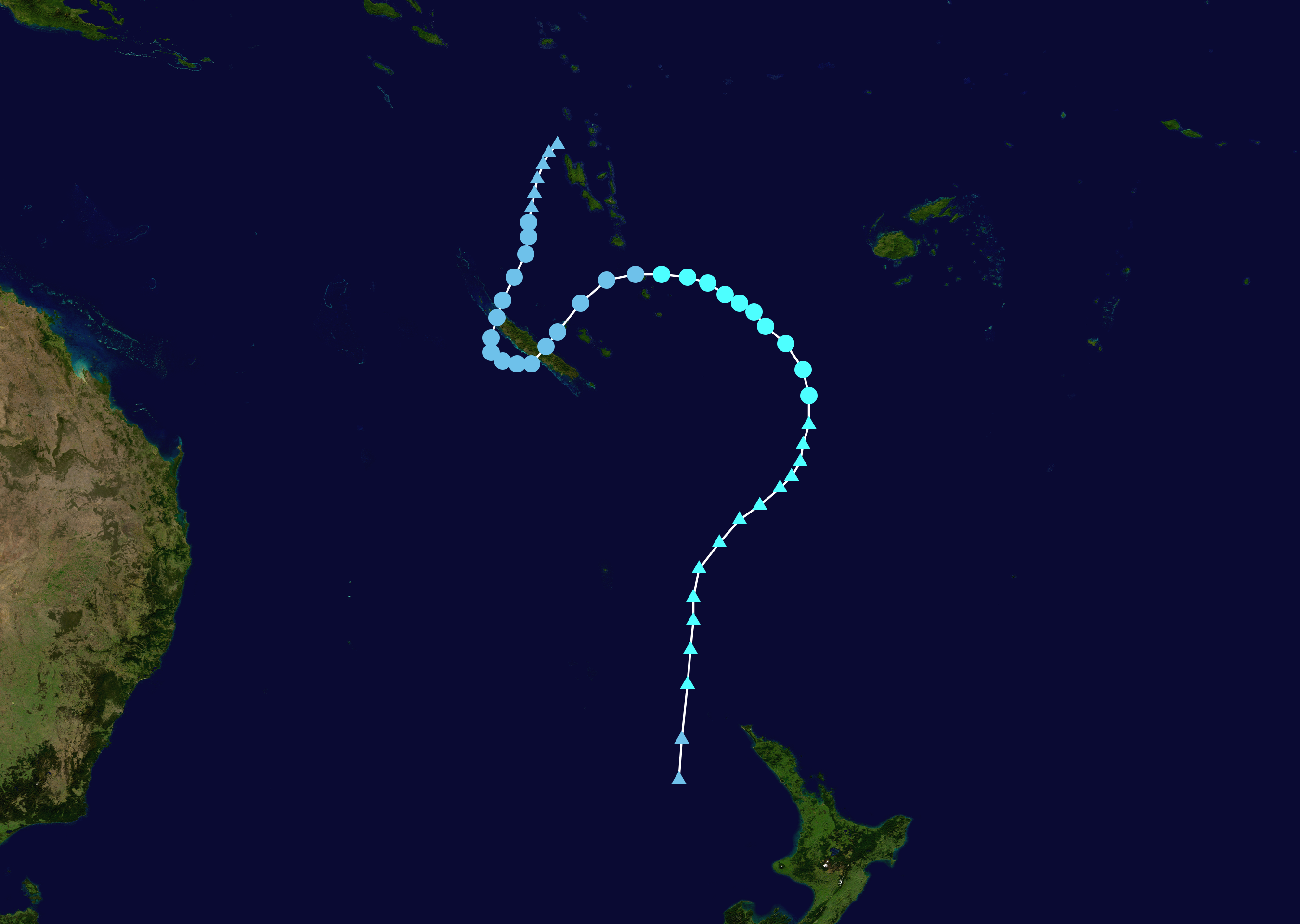
- Duration: December 15 – December 25
- Peak intensity: 100 km/h (65 mph) (10-min); 980 hPa (mbar)

On December 15, the FMS reported that a tropical depression had developed, within the monsoon trough just to the north of Vanuatu. The system subsequently persisted for a week with little change in intensity, as it gradually moved south-southwest over Vanuatu and New Caledonia. Between December 20–21, an area of high pressure developed to the south of the system, which prevented any further southwards movement. The system subsequently moved north-eastwards and passed over southern Vanuatu, before the FMS reported late on December 23, that the cyclone had become equivalent to a category 1 tropical cyclone and named it Eseta. At around this time the system was located about 525 km (325 mi) to the southwest of Nadi, Fiji and had started to move south-westwards as it interacted with a trough of low pressure in the Tasman Sea. During December 24, the system intensified further, before the FMS reported later that day that Eseta had peaked with 10-minute sustained wind speeds of 100 km/h (65 mph). The system subsequently degenerated into an extratropical depression and impacting New Zealand between December 29–30.

As a tropical depression, Eseta caused heavy rainfall within Vanuatu, however there were no reports of any damages to property or crops. The system subsequently caused strong gusty winds and prolonged heavy rainfall over the Fiji Islands between December 22 – 27, with Nadi airport reporting sustained winds of 35 mph (55 km/h) and wind gusts of 58 mph (95 km/h). The heavy rain lead to widespread flooding over various parts of the island nation, with minor damage to roads and crops reported. The system's remnants brought heavy rain and flooding to parts of New Zealand's Northland, Auckland, Waikato and the Bay of Plenty, with flood damage to a supermarkets storeroom was estimated at NZD30,000, USD25,000. Several homes were evacuate while it was thought that the heavy rain had contributed to at least 50 injuries with seven of those in a weather-related car accident.

=== Tropical Cyclone Delilah ===
- Category 2 tropical cyclone (Australian scale)
- Tropical storm (SSHWS)
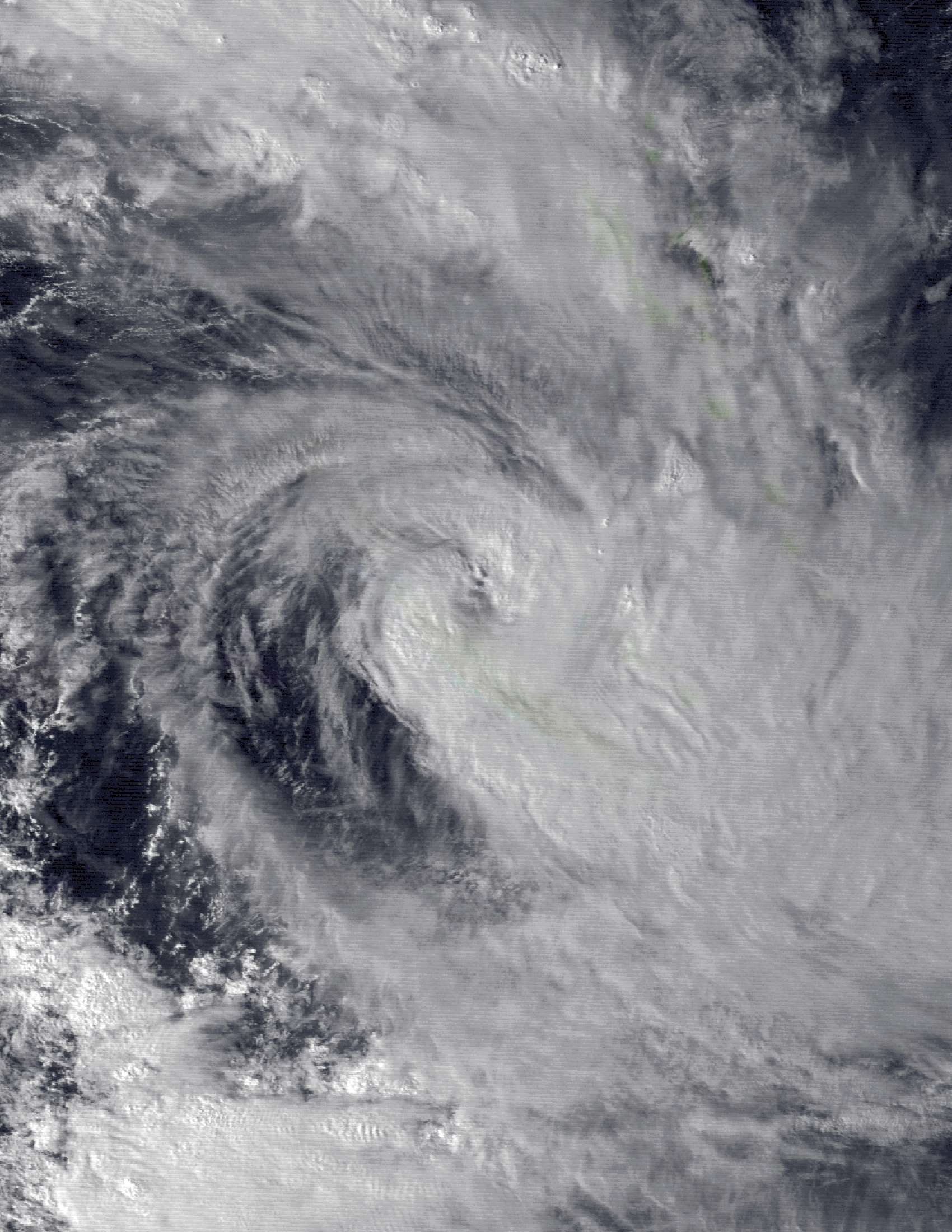
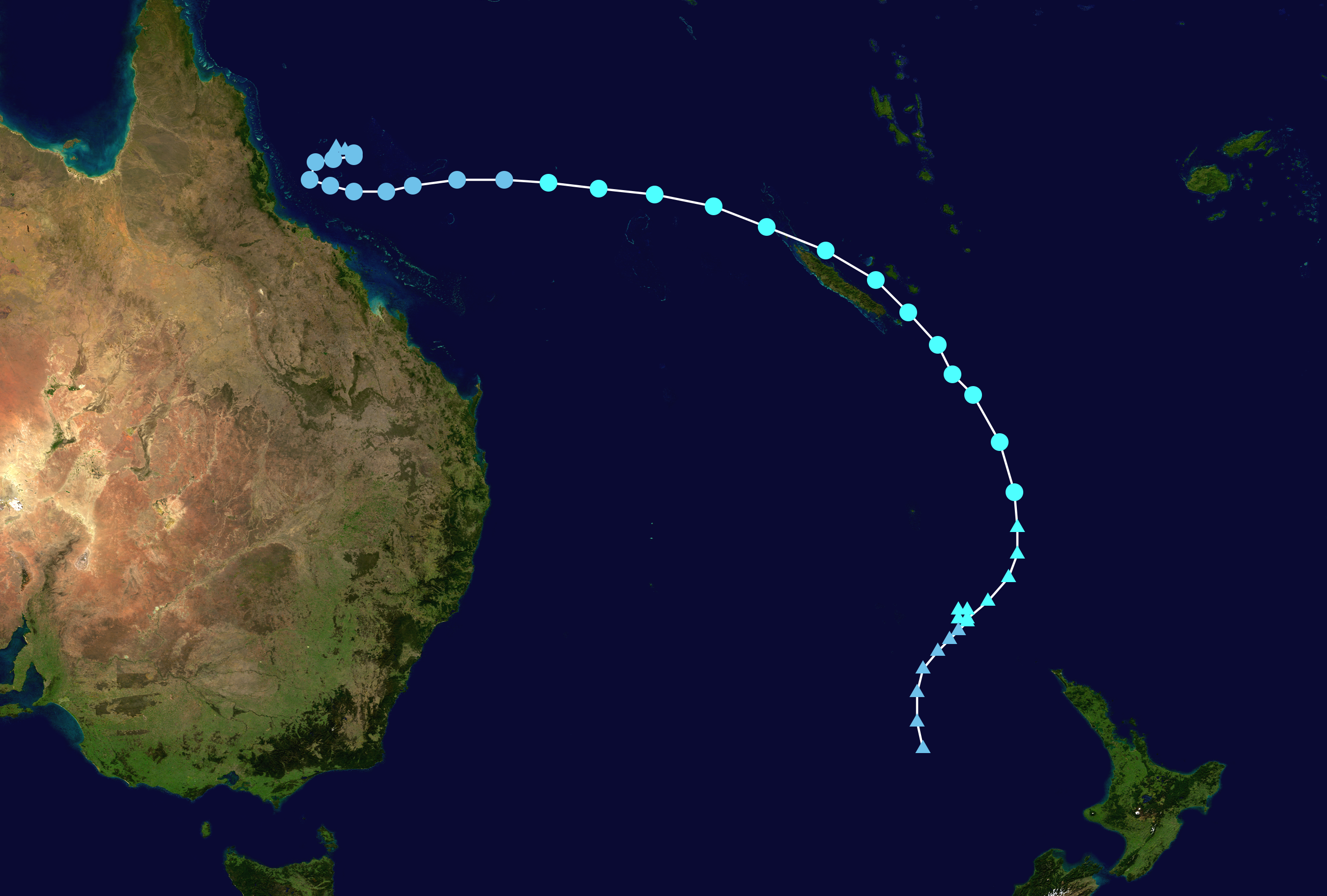
- Duration: January 1 (Entered basin) – January 4
- Peak intensity: 110 km/h (70 mph) (10-min); 975 hPa (mbar)

On January 1, Tropical Cyclone Delilah moved into the South Pacific basin from the Australian region, as a category 1 tropical cyclone on the Australian scale. During that day as the system continued to intensify and move south-eastwards towards New Caledonia and the Loyalty Islands, the JTWC initiated advisories on the system and designated it as Tropical Cyclone 04P. During January 2, as the system passed about 20–30 mi (30–50 km) of the northeastern coast of New Caledonia, the JTWC and the FMS reported that the system had peaked with sustained windspeeds of 110 km/h (70 mph). During the next day Delilah started to weaken and transition into an extra tropical cyclone, as vertical wind shear over the system increased and the upper level westerlies intensified. The system subsequently became an extra tropical cyclone during January 4, and started moving southwards towards New Zealand. The system subsequently passed close to northern New Zealand during January 7, before it merged with a cold front during January 8.

Within New Caledonia, Cyclone Delilah wind gusts of 166 km/h (103 mph) and 157 km/h (98 mph) were recorded in Koumac and Touho. A rainfall total of 330 mm (13 in) was recorded at both Pouébo and Ponérihouen, while there were also two deaths reported in the French Territory.

=== Tropical Cyclone Fili ===
- Category 2 tropical cyclone (Australian scale)
- Tropical storm (SSHWS)
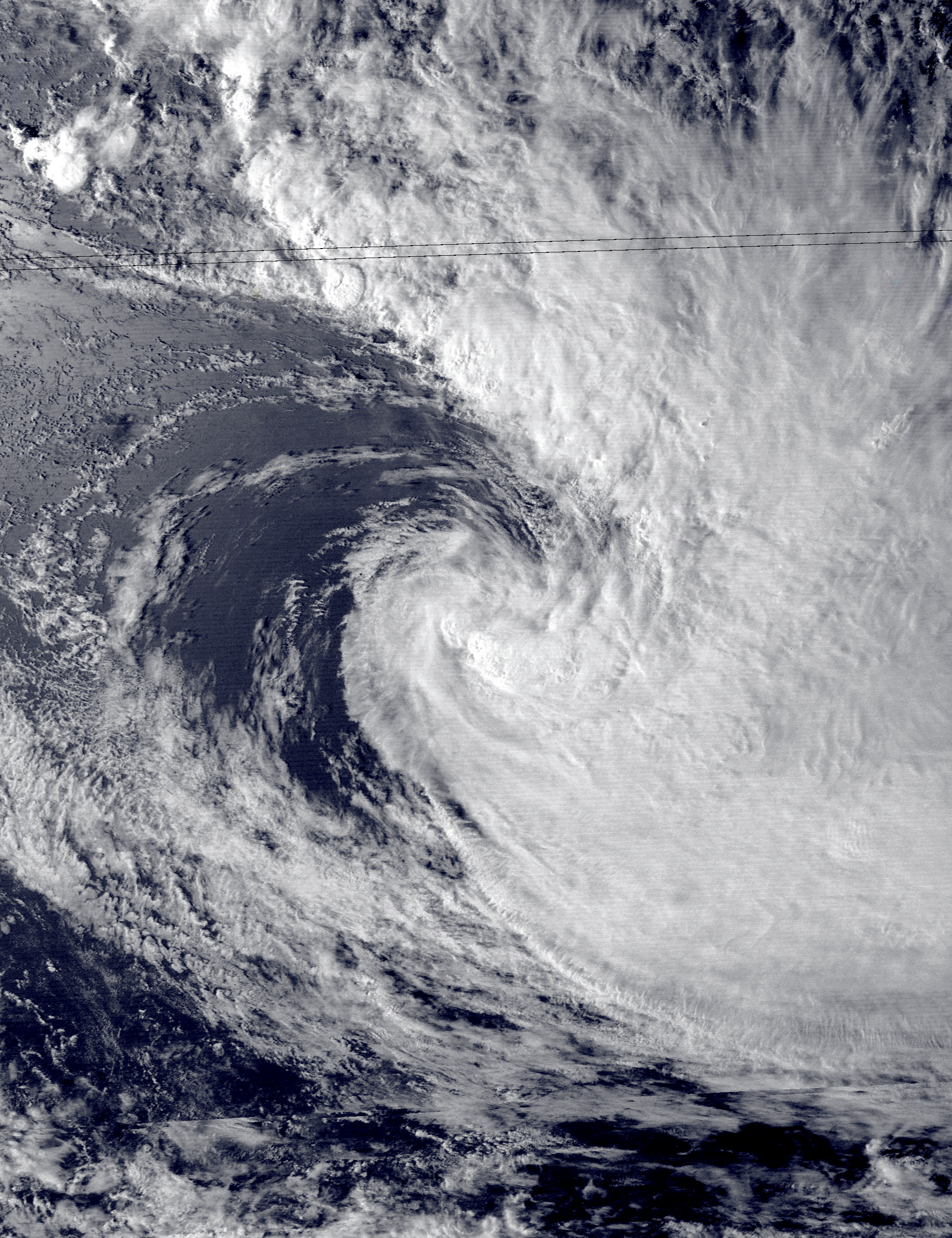
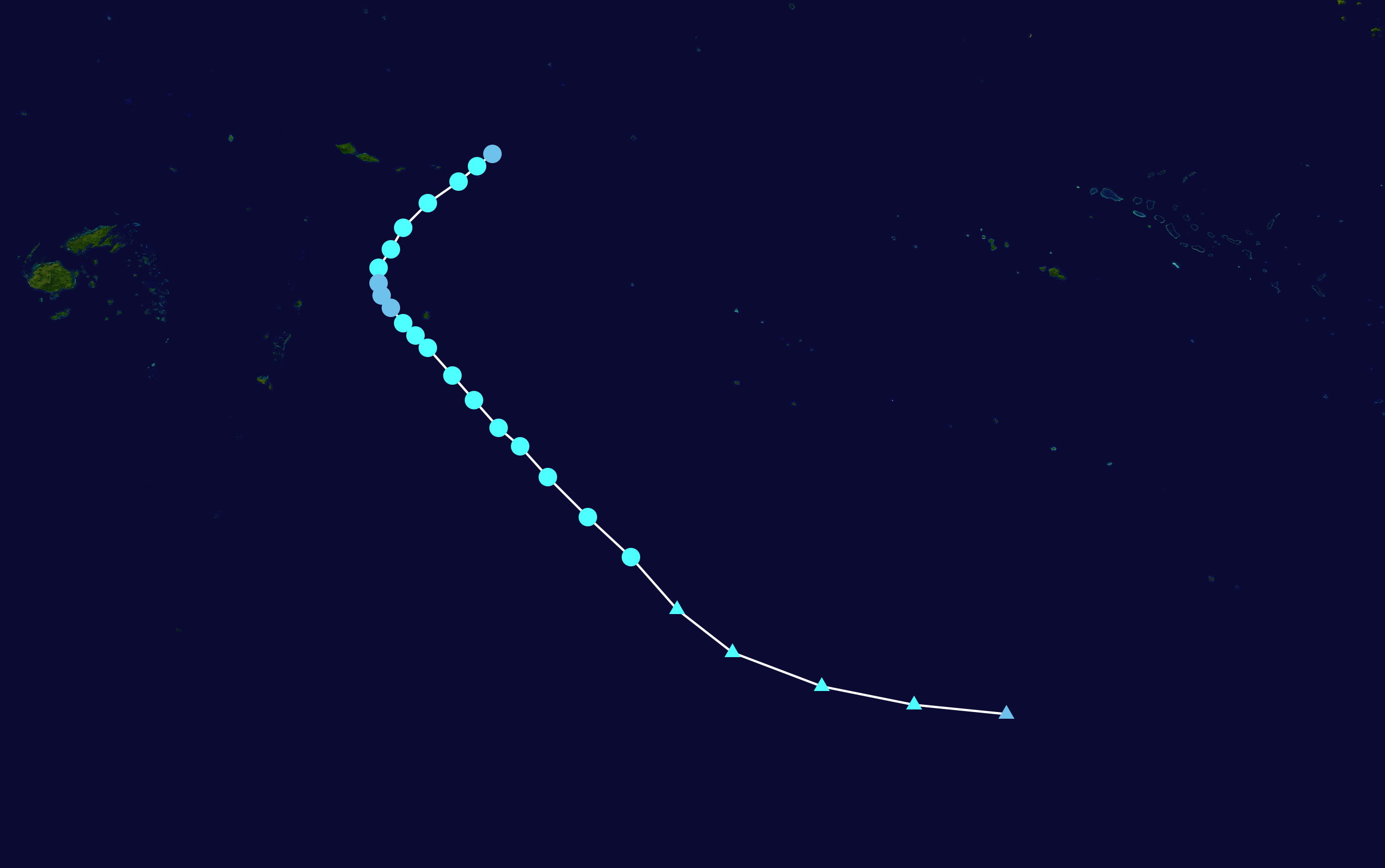
- Duration: January 1 – January 8
- Peak intensity: 95 km/h (60 mph) (10-min); 985 hPa (mbar)

A shallow and ill-defined tropical depression developed on January 1, about 400 km (250 mi) to the east of the Samoan Islands. Over the next few days the depression moved south-westwards before it weakened slightly during January 3, with atmospheric convection surrounding the system decreasing. The system subsequently recurved and started to move towards the southeast towards the island nation of Niue. The FMS subsequently named the system Fili during January 5, after it had become a Category 2 tropical cyclone with peak wind speeds of 95 km/h (60 mph). After being named the system continued to move south-eastwards, before it was last noted, well to the southeast of the Cook Islands during January 8. There was no damage to any islands associated with Fili, however, the FMS reported that strong winds had appeared to cause some minor damage on Niue.

=== Tropical Cyclone Gina ===
- Category 1 tropical cyclone (Australian scale)
- Tropical storm (SSHWS)
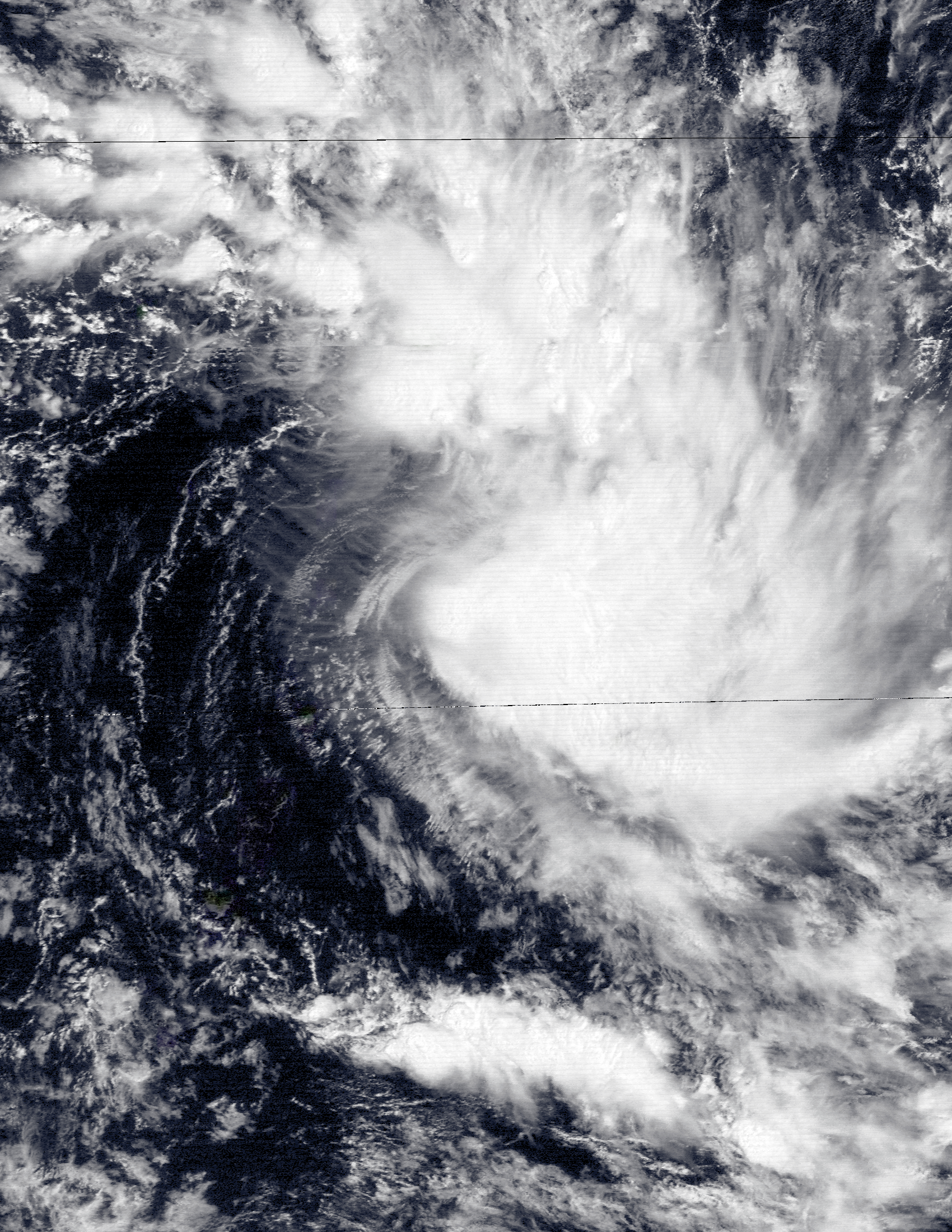
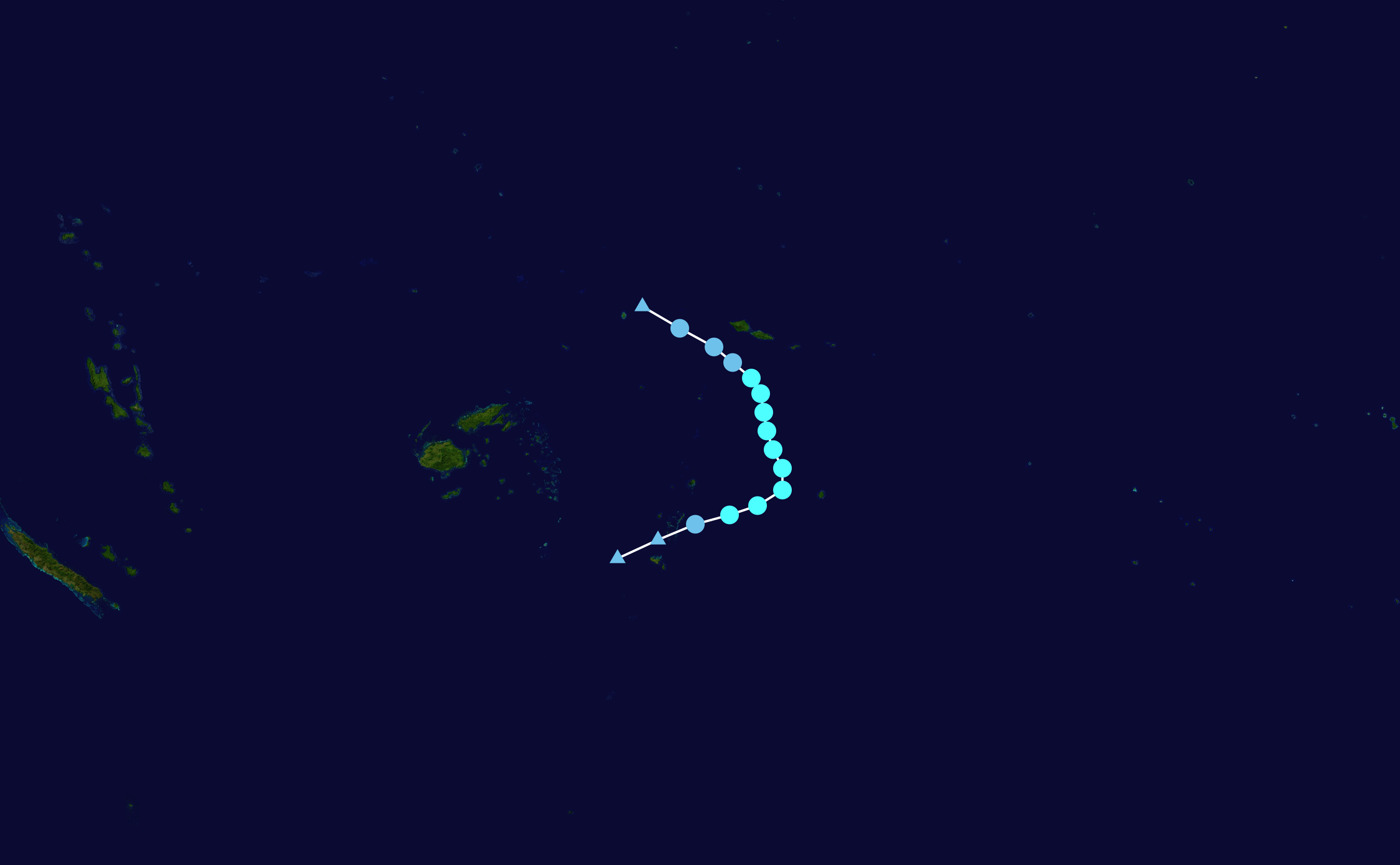
- Duration: January 6 – January 9
- Peak intensity: 85 km/h (50 mph) (10-min); 987 hPa (mbar)

Gina existed from January 6 to January 9.

=== Severe Tropical Cyclone Harry ===
- Category 4 severe tropical cyclone (Australian scale)
- Category 4 tropical cyclone (SSHWS)
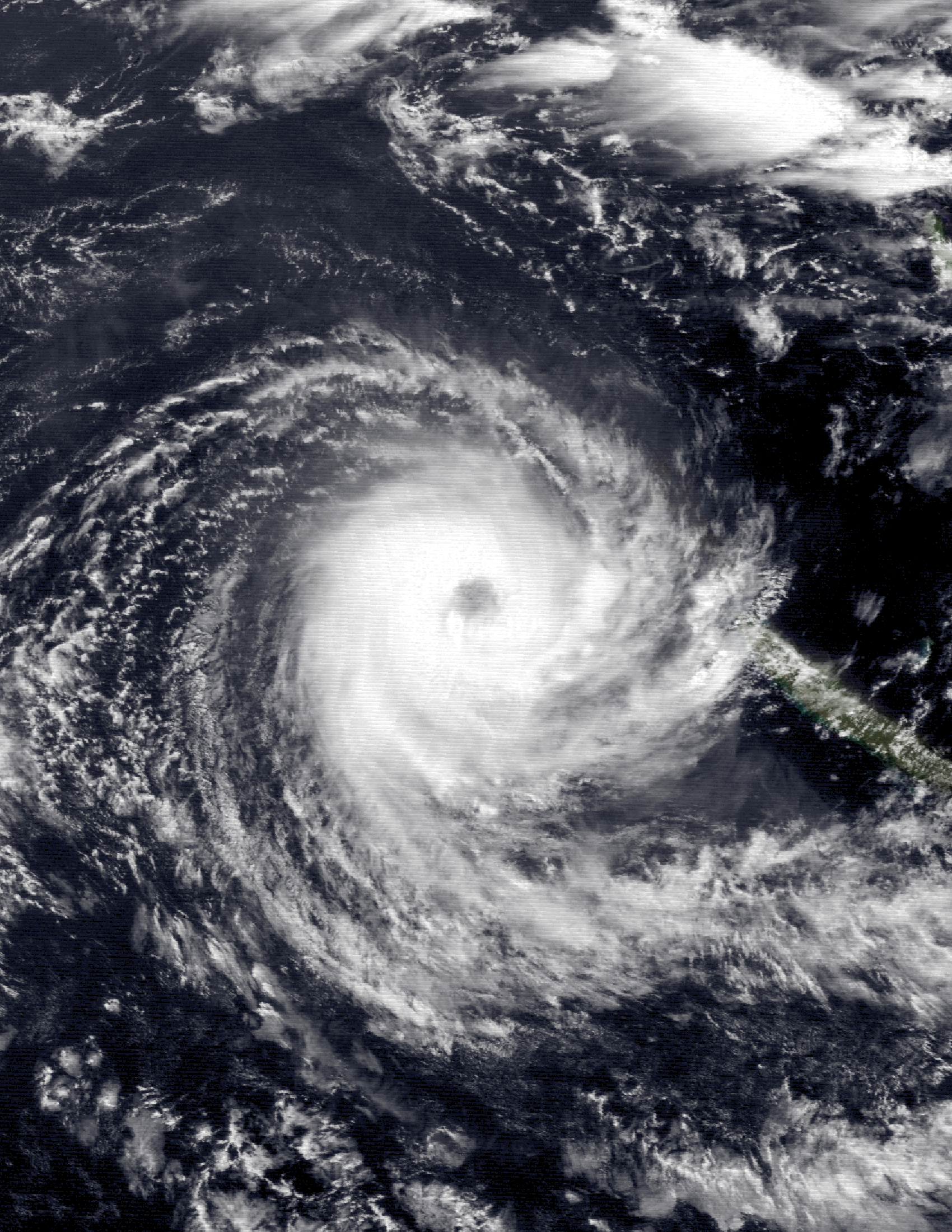
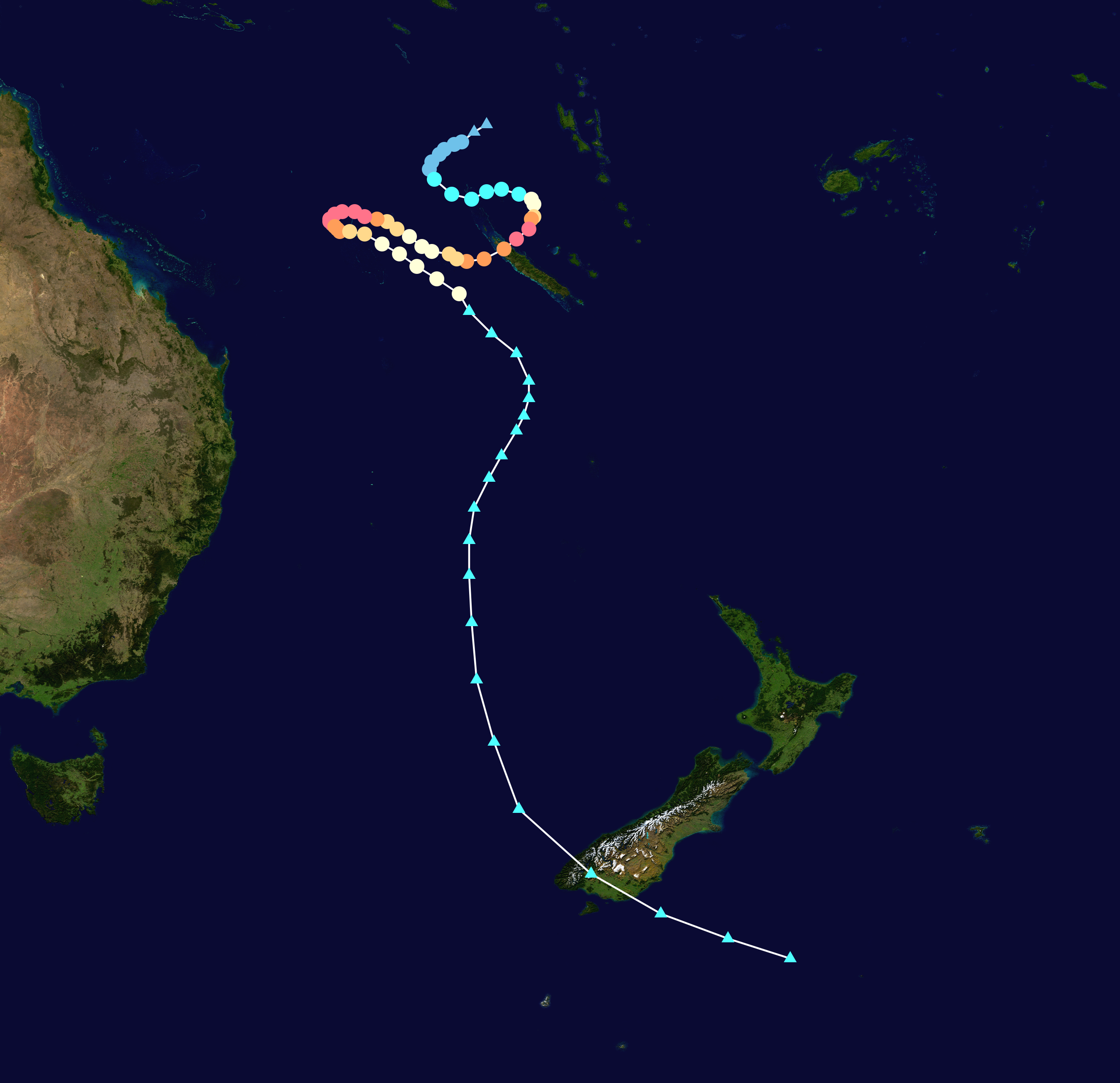
- Duration: February 7 – February 23 (Out of basin from February 13-17)
- Peak intensity: 165 km/h (105 mph) (10-min); 940 hPa (mbar)

On February 7, TCWC Nadi reported that a shallow depression had developed, within the monsoon trough about 800 km (495 mi) to the west of Vanuatu. Over the next day the system moved eastwards and developed into a category 1 tropical cyclone.

=== Unnamed tropical cyclone ===
- Category 1 tropical cyclone (Australian scale)
- Tropical storm (SSHWS)
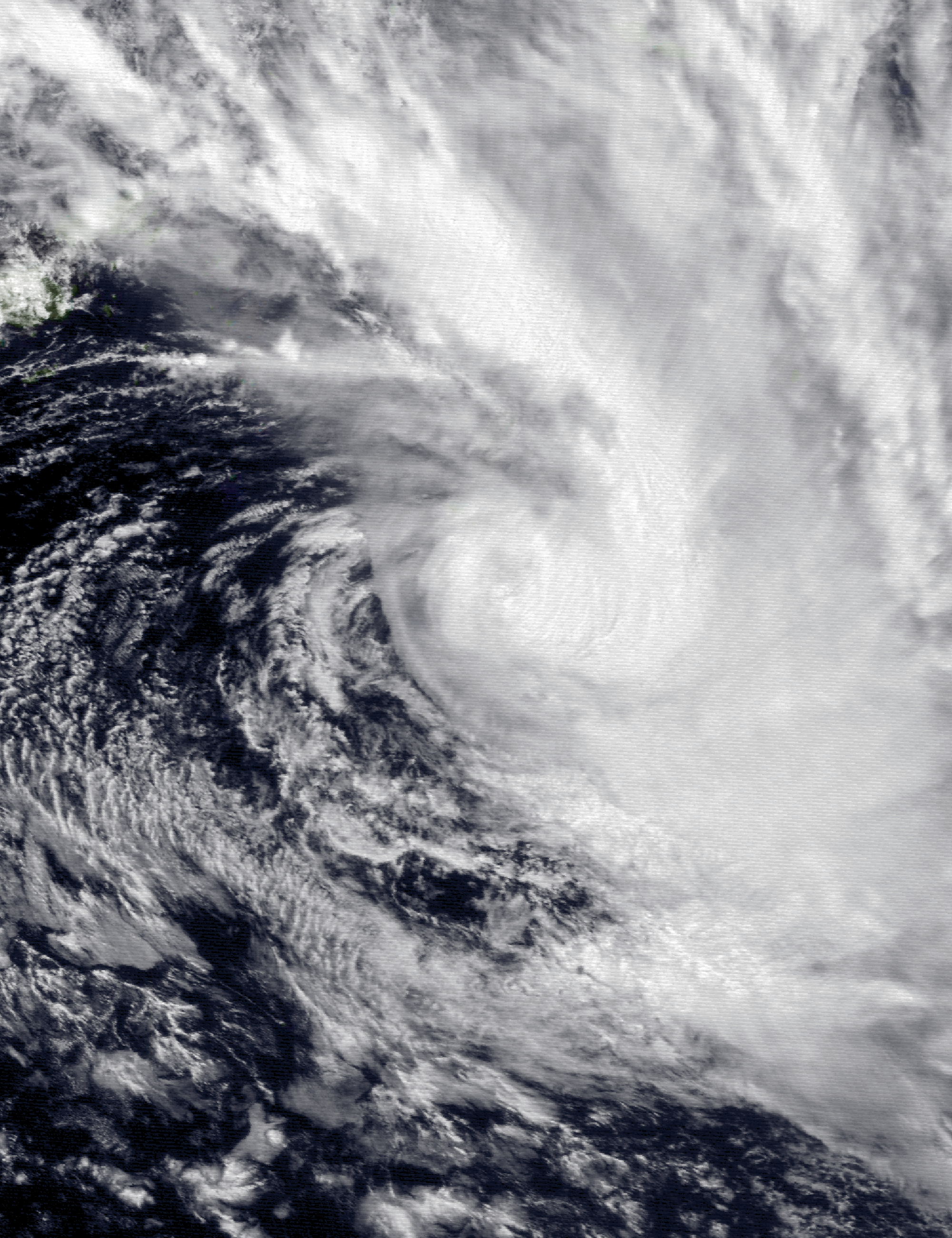
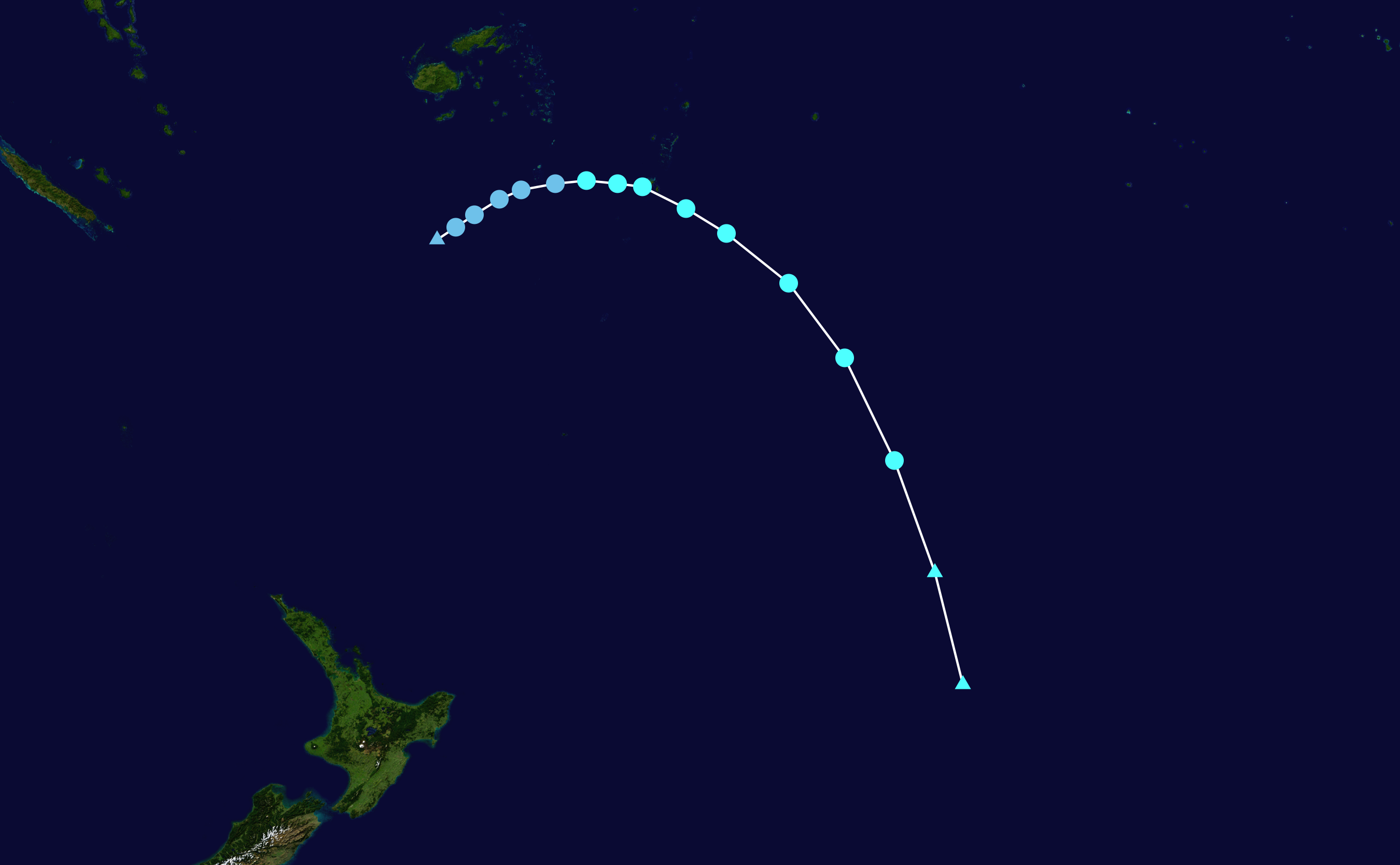
- Duration: February 11 – February 14
- Peak intensity: 85 km/h (50 mph) (10-min); 987 hPa (mbar)

According to TCWC Wellington, an unnamed tropical cyclone existed between 11-14 February.

=== Severe Tropical Cyclone Hinano ===
- Category 3 severe tropical cyclone (Australian scale)
- Category 2 tropical cyclone (SSHWS)
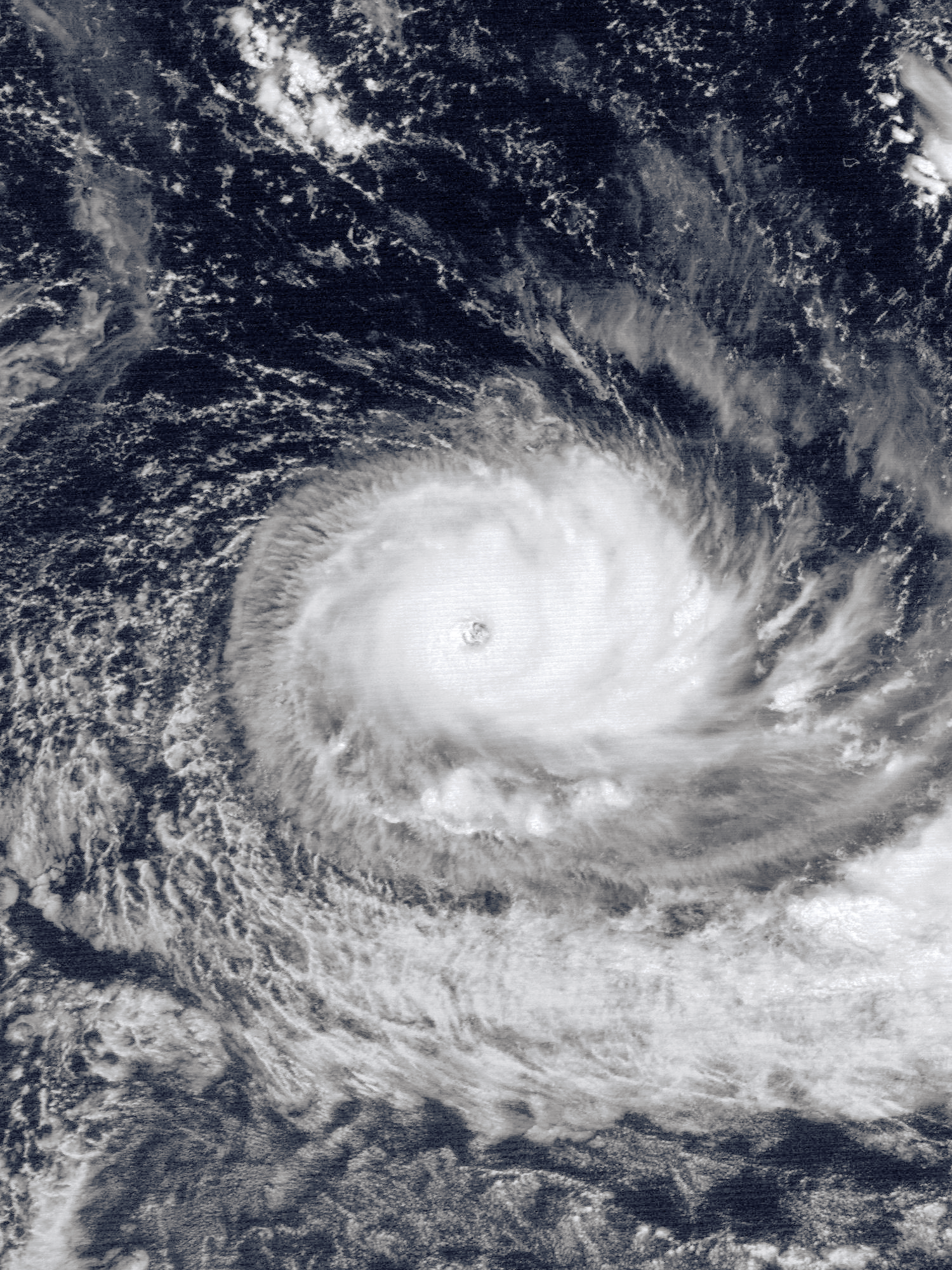
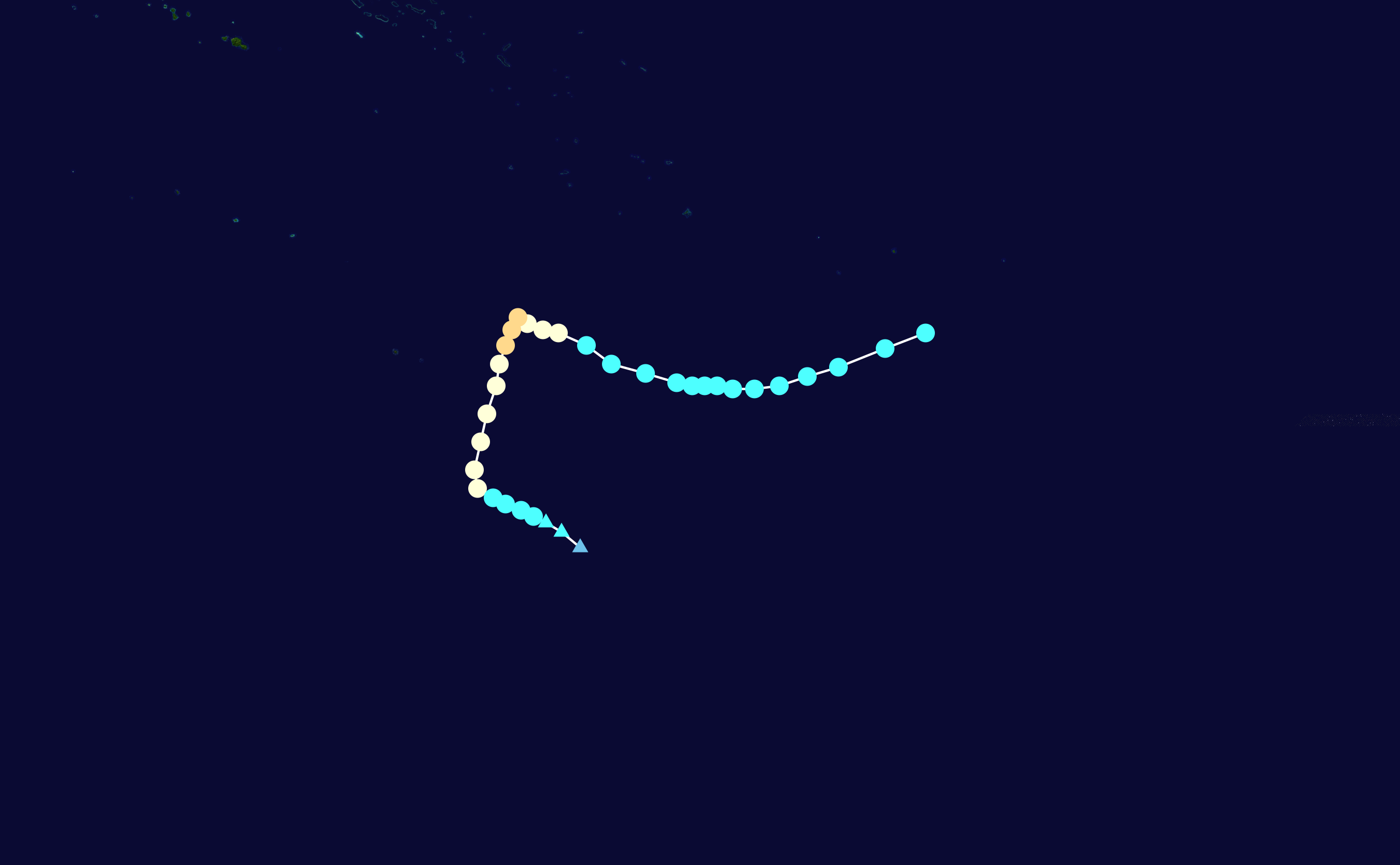
- Duration: February 21 – March 1
- Peak intensity: 120 km/h (75 mph) (10-min); 970 hPa (mbar)

The precursor tropical disturbance to Severe Tropical Cyclone Hinano was first noted during February 19, by the United States Synoptic Analysis Branch, while it was located around 630 km (390 mi) to the southwest of Adamstown in the Pitcairn Islands. The system subsequently moved south-westwards and was classified as a weak tropical depression by the Tahiti Meteorological office during February 21.

=== Severe Tropical Cyclone Ivy ===
- Category 3 severe tropical cyclone (Australian scale)
- Category 3 tropical cyclone (SSHWS)
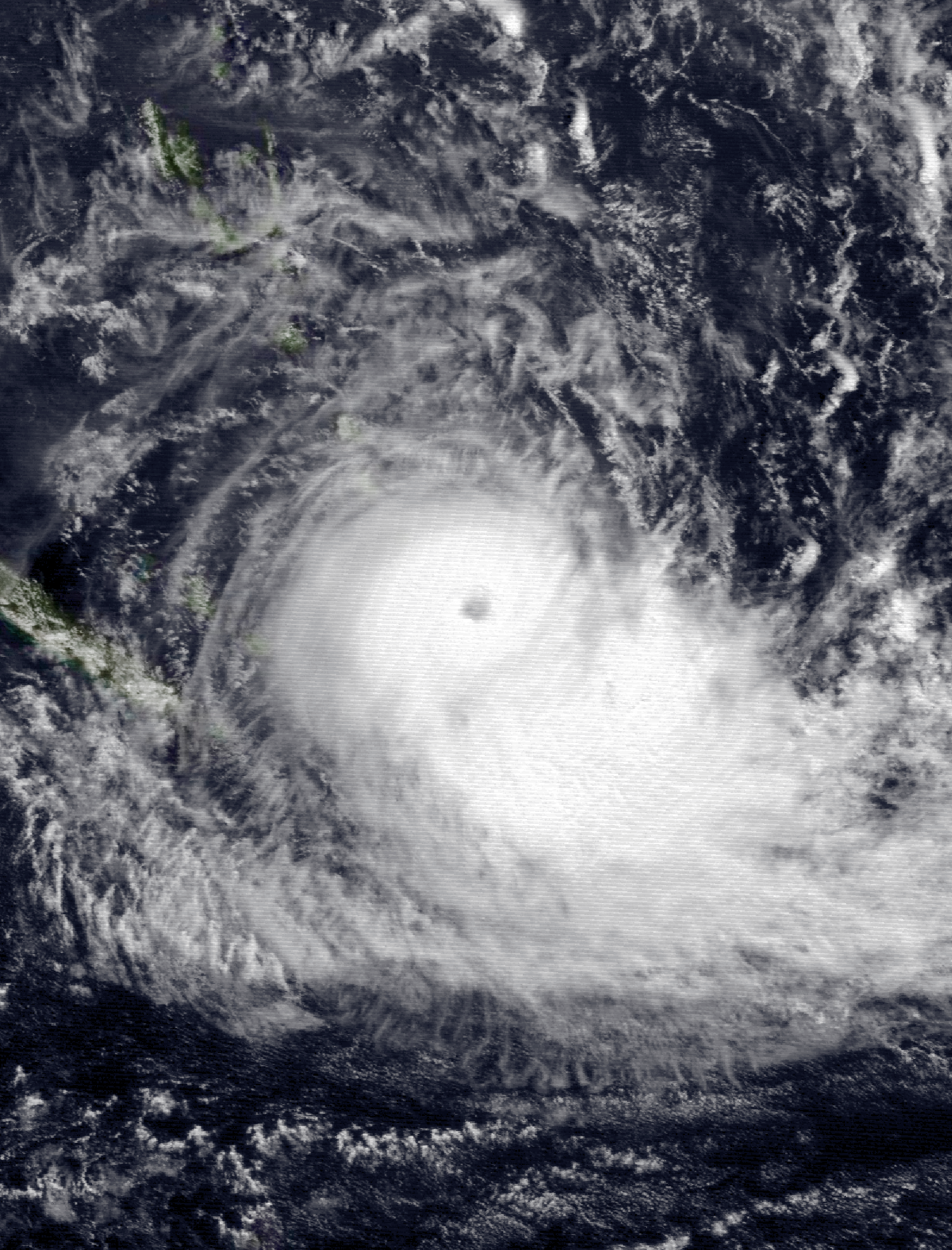
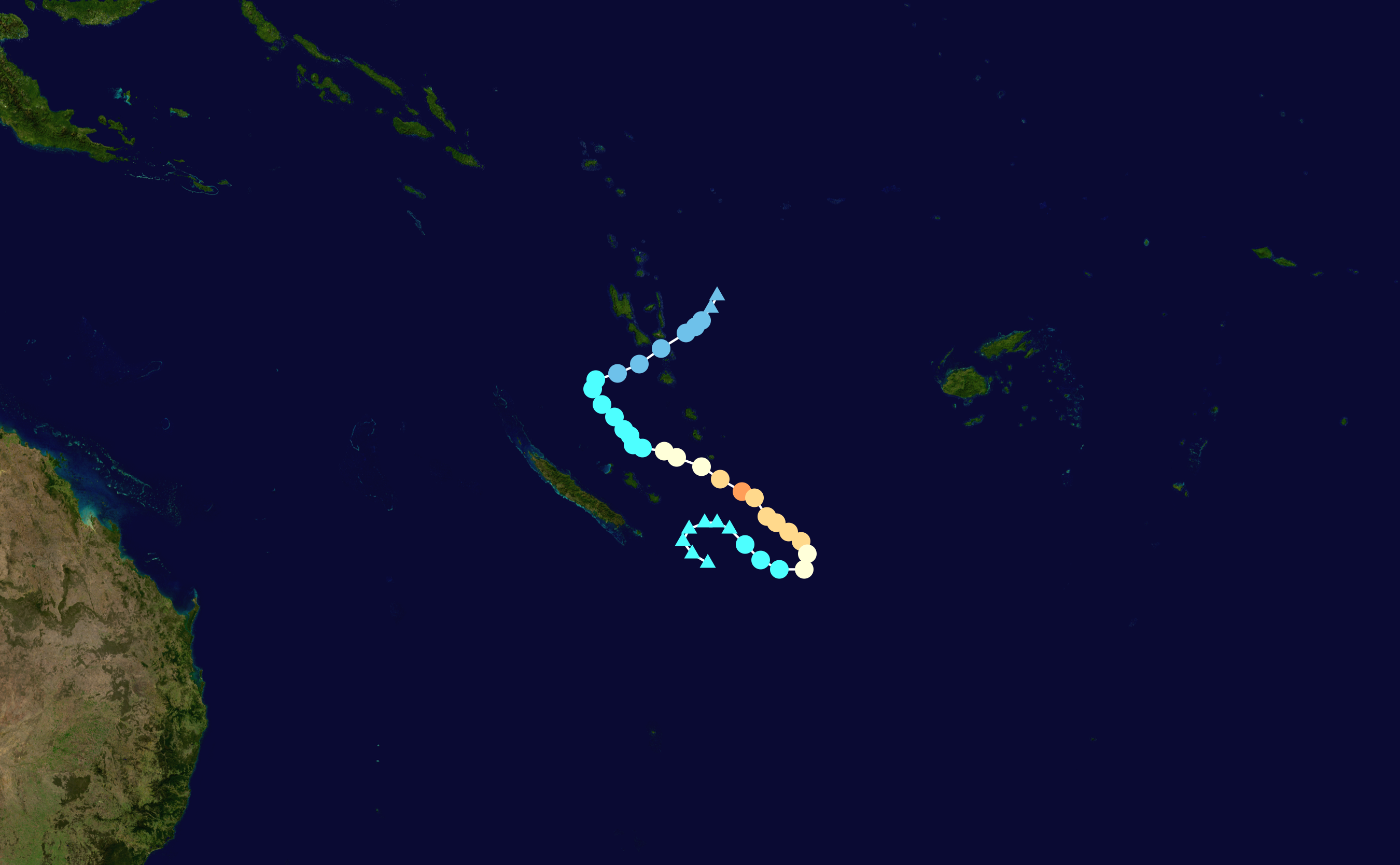
- Duration: February 21 – March 3
- Peak intensity: 155 km/h (100 mph) (10-min); 960 hPa (mbar)

On February 21, a depression developed within the monsoon trough to the north of Vanuatu, and started to move towards the east.

=== Severe Tropical Cyclone Judy ===
- Category 3 severe tropical cyclone (Australian scale)
- Category 2 tropical cyclone (SSHWS)
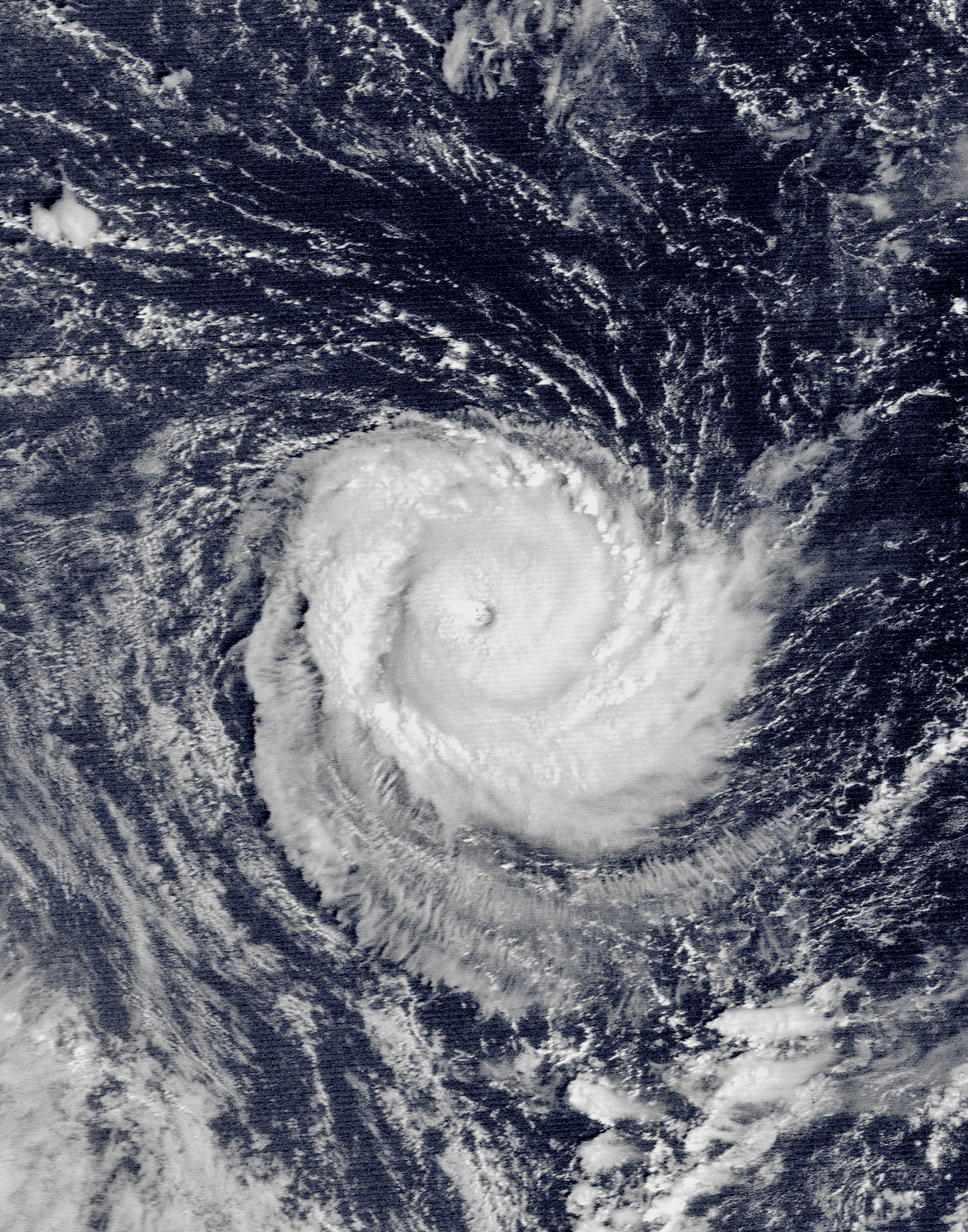
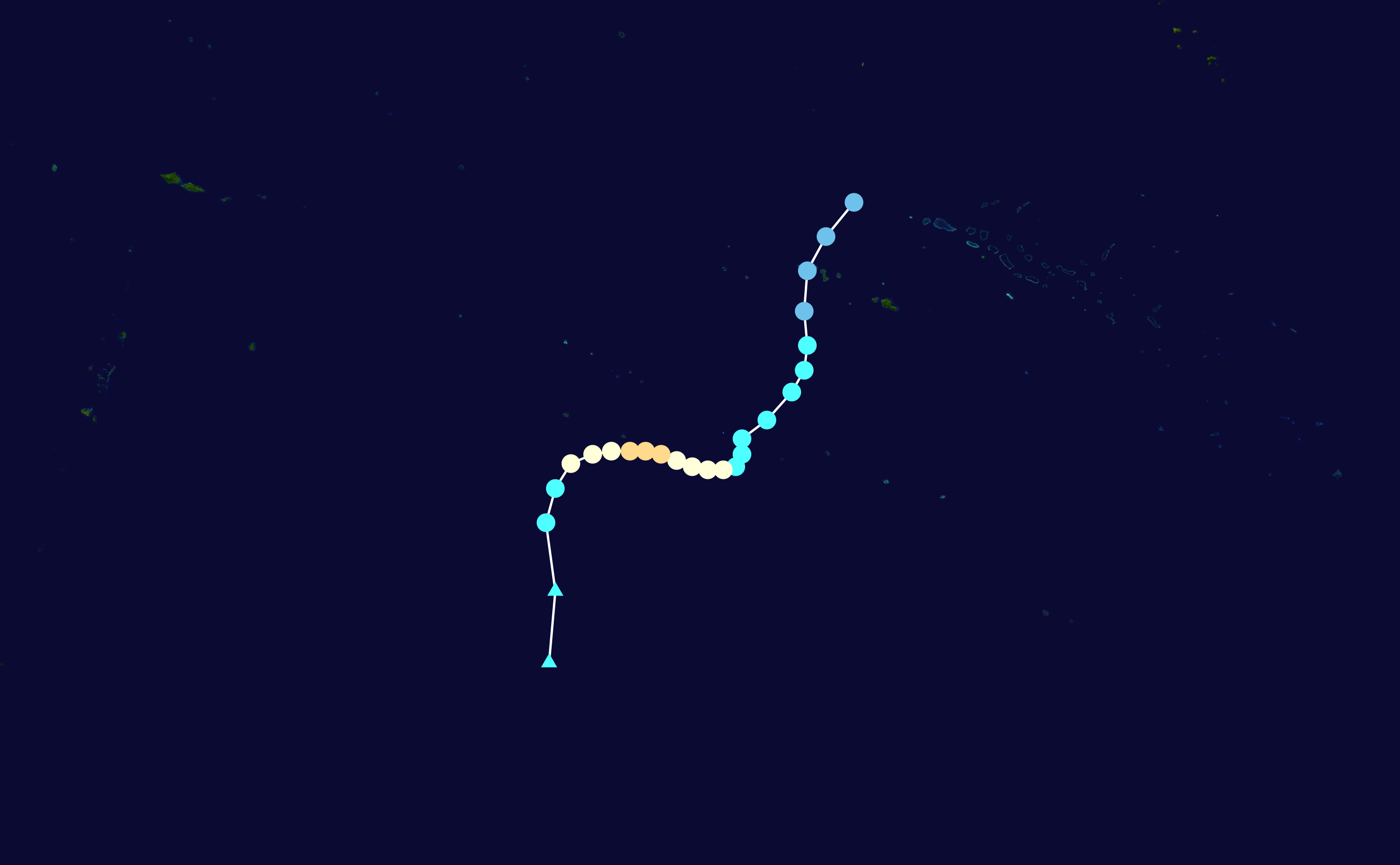
- Duration: February 22 – February 28
- Peak intensity: 150 km/h (90 mph) (10-min); 965 hPa (mbar)

The precursor tropical disturbance to Severe Tropical Cyclone Judy was first noted during February 20, by the United States Synoptic Analysis Branch, while it was located around 320 km (200 mi) to the northeast of the French Polynesian island of Tahiti. The system subsequently moved south-westwards and was classified as a moderate tropical storm during February 23, by the French Polynesian Meteorological Service.

=== Tropical Cyclone Kerry ===
- Category 2 tropical cyclone (Australian scale)
- Tropical storm (SSHWS)
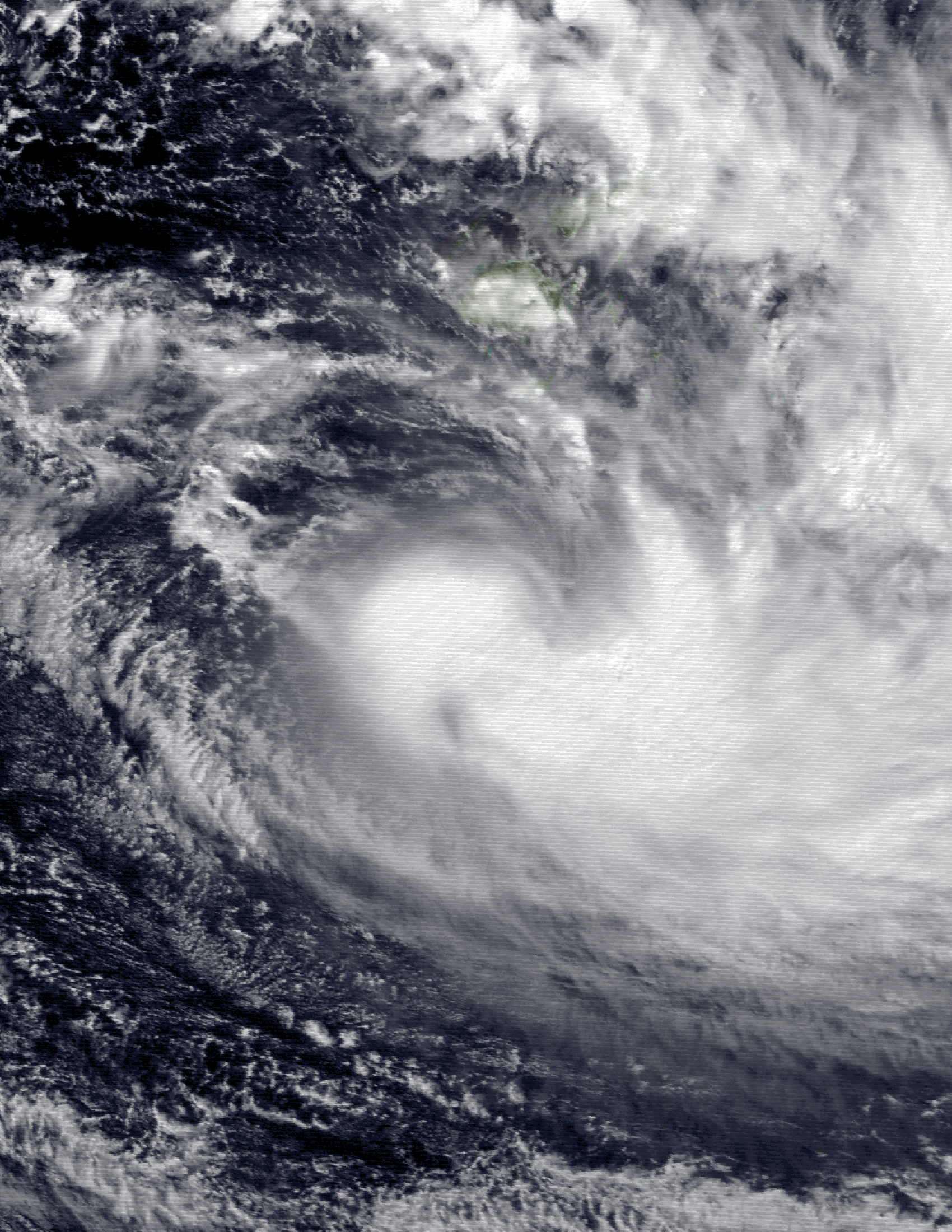
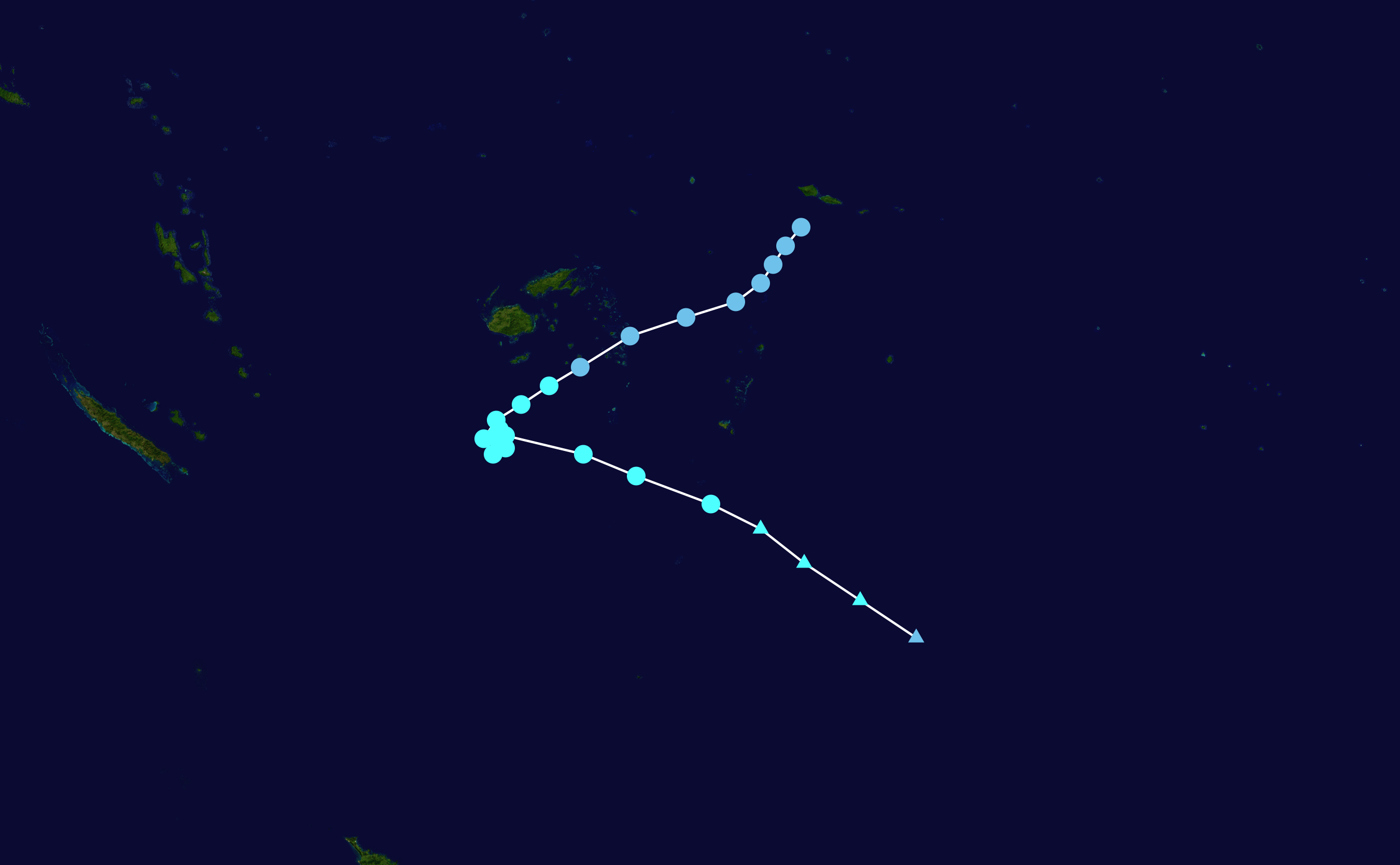
- Duration: March 29 – April 4
- Peak intensity: 95 km/h (60 mph) (10-min); 985 hPa (mbar)

On March 29, TCWC Nadi started to monitor a westward moving tropical depression that had developed within a monsoon trough about x to the x of x. Over the next few days, the system moved towards the west before after it several large pressure drops were reported,

=== Severe Tropical Cyclone Lili ===
- Category 3 severe tropical cyclone (Australian scale)
- Category 3 tropical cyclone (SSHWS)
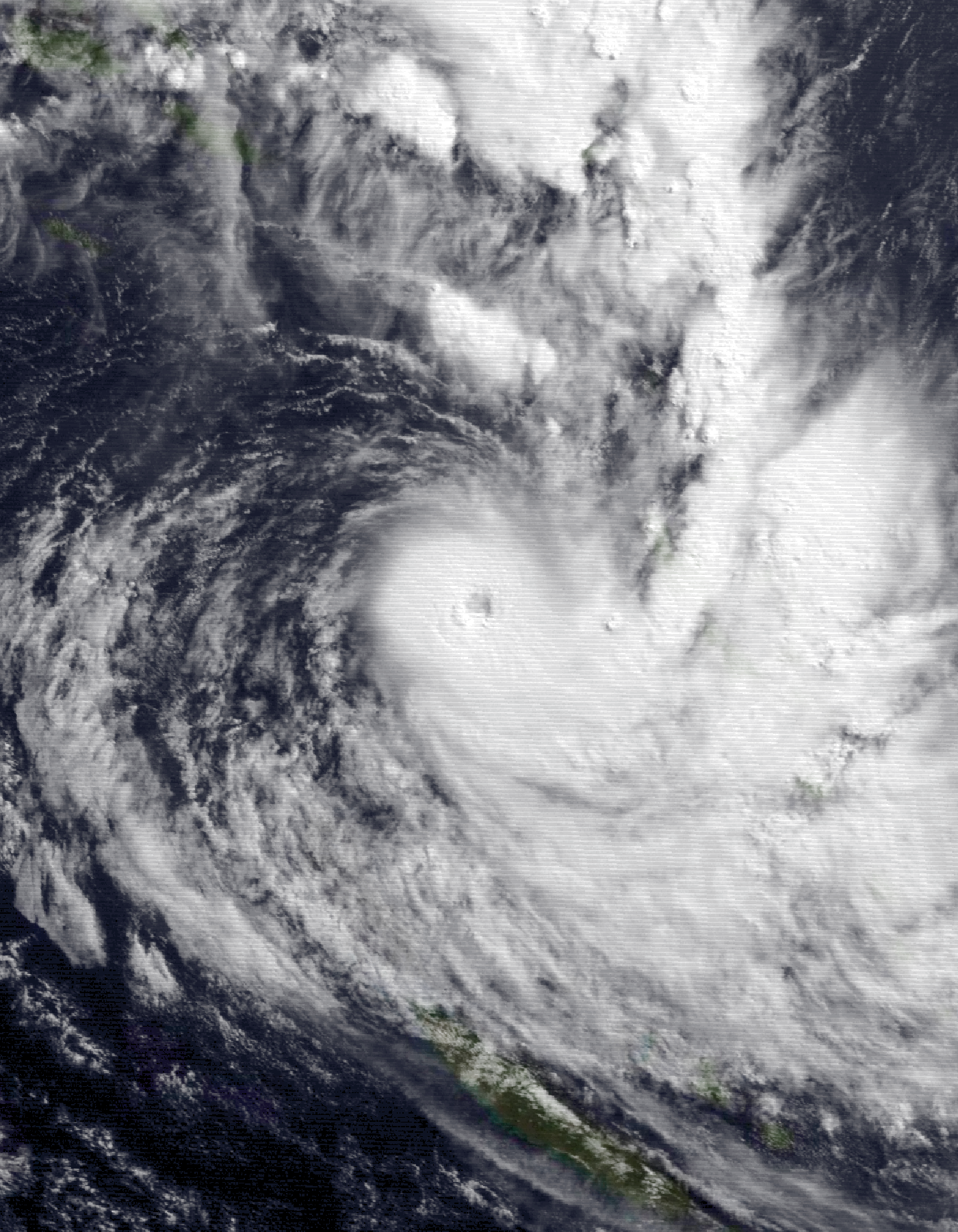
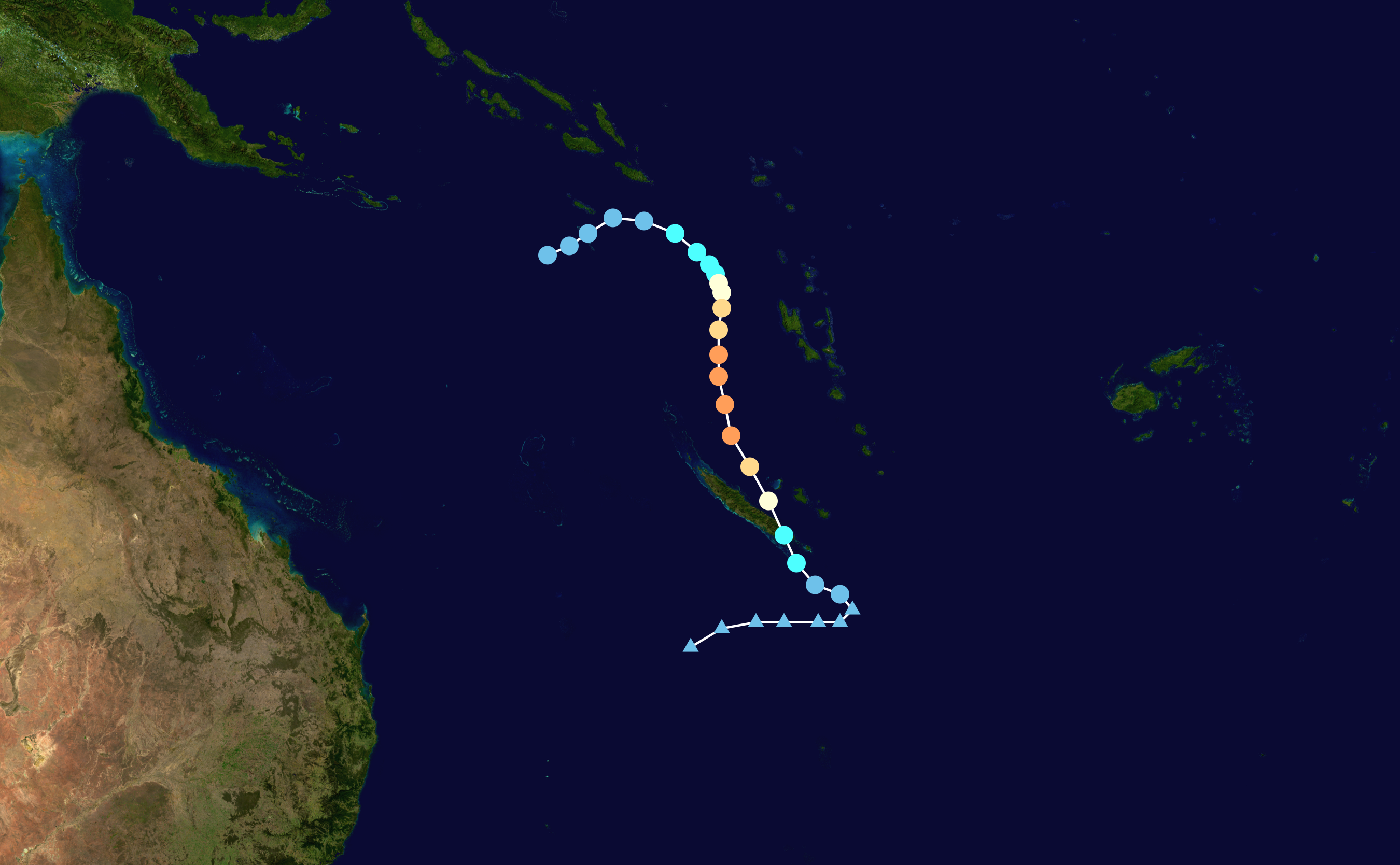
- Duration: April 6 – April 13
- Peak intensity: 150 km/h (90 mph) (10-min); 955 hPa (mbar)

Lili existed from April 6 to April 13.

=== Tropical Cyclone Meena ===
- Category 1 tropical cyclone (Australian scale)
- Tropical storm (SSHWS)
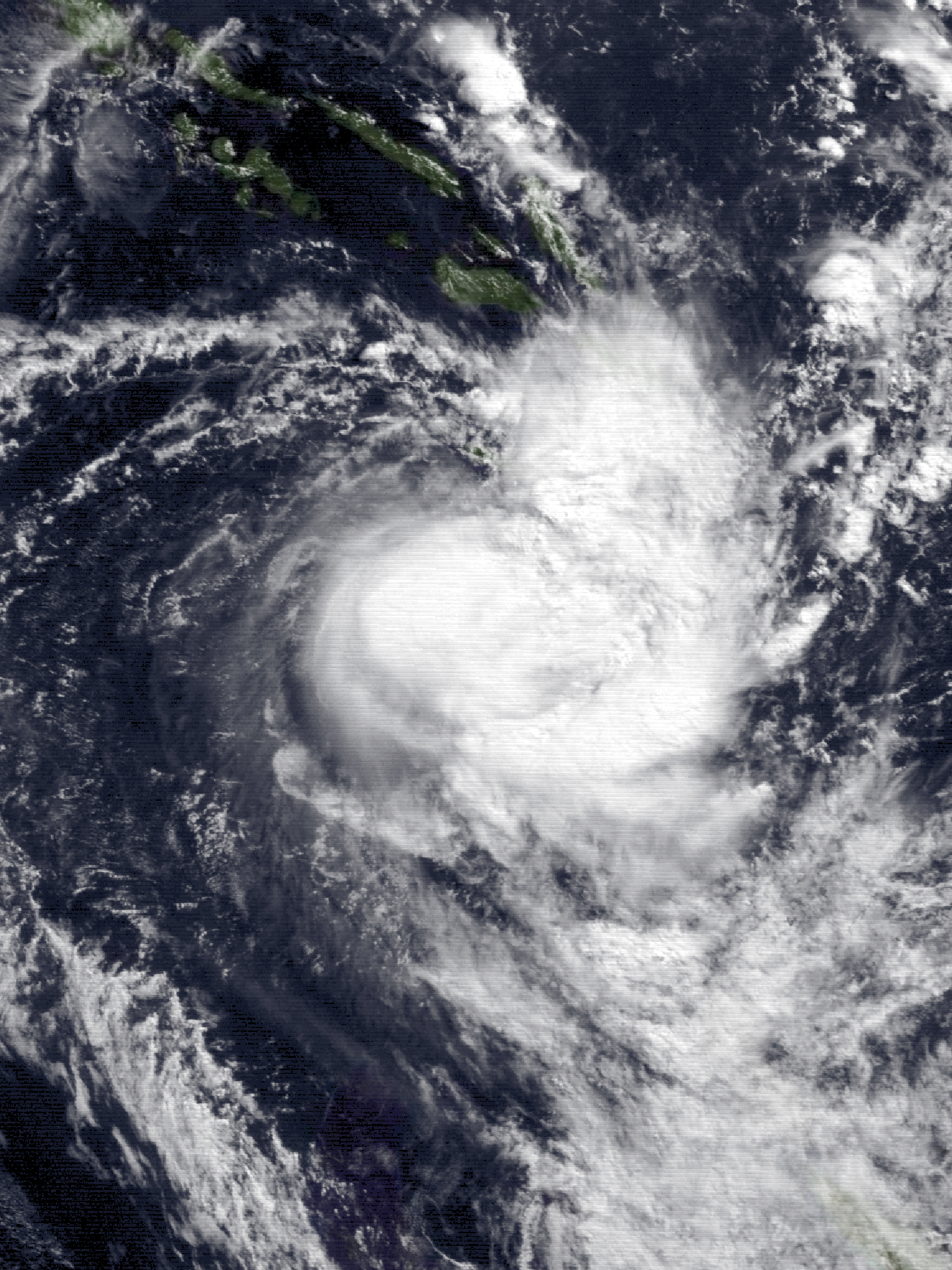
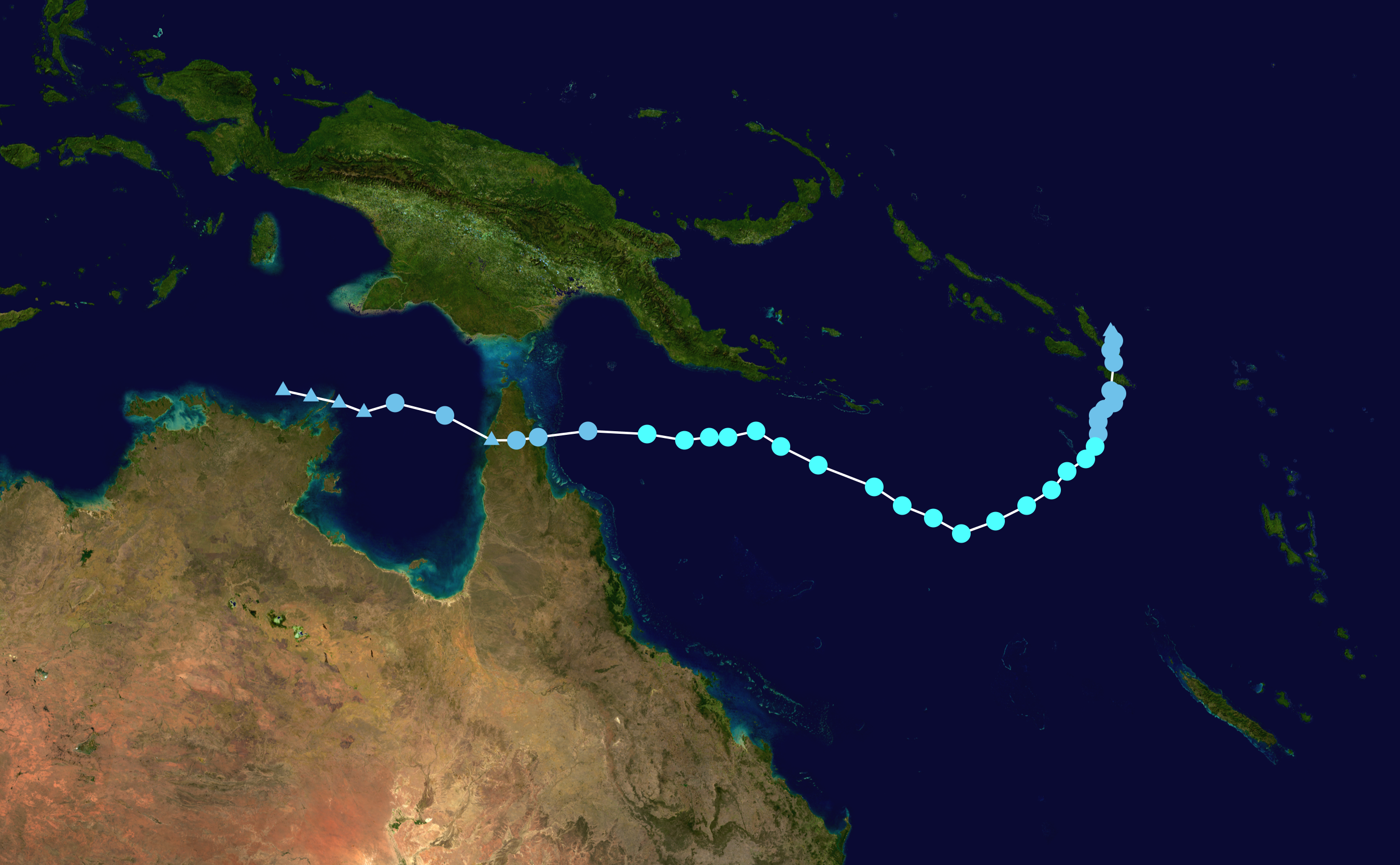
- Duration: May 1 – May 5 (Exited basin)
- Peak intensity: 75 km/h (45 mph) (10-min); 990 hPa (mbar)

On May 1, TCWC Nadi reported that a shallow depression had developed within the monsoon trough, over the south-eastern Solomon Islands. Over the next few days the system remained weak and ill-defined as it moved slowly southwards. On May 3, the JTWC initiated advisories on the system and designated it as Tropical Cyclone 27P, as it started to gradually intensify further. The system was subsequently named Meena by TCWC Nadi during May 4, as it had developed into a category 1 tropical cyclone on the Australian scale. Meena subsequently moved into the Australian region during May 5, where it reached its peak intensity before making landfall on the Cape York Peninsula during May 9.

=== Tropical Depression 28P (Ernie) ===
- Tropical depression (Australian scale)
- Tropical storm (SSHWS)
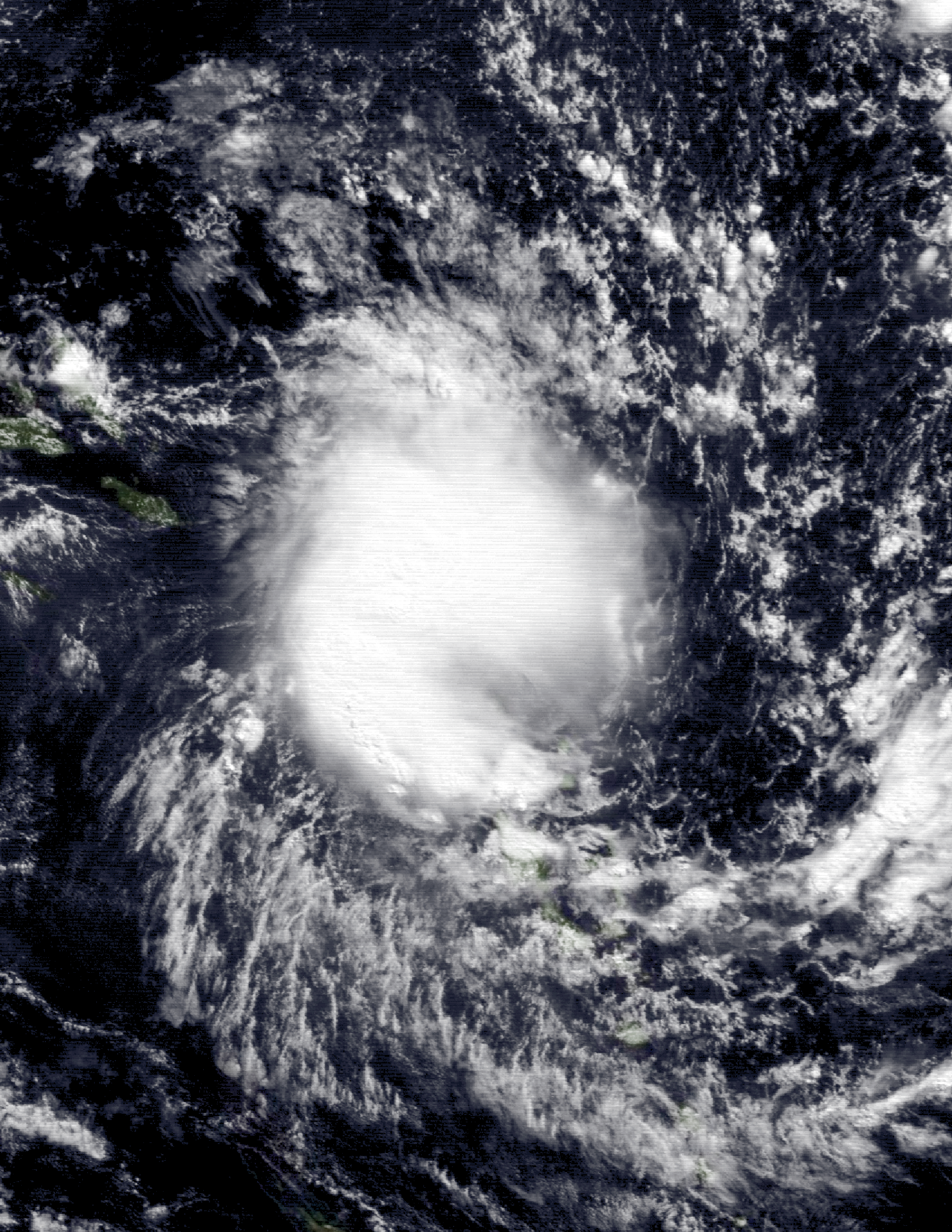
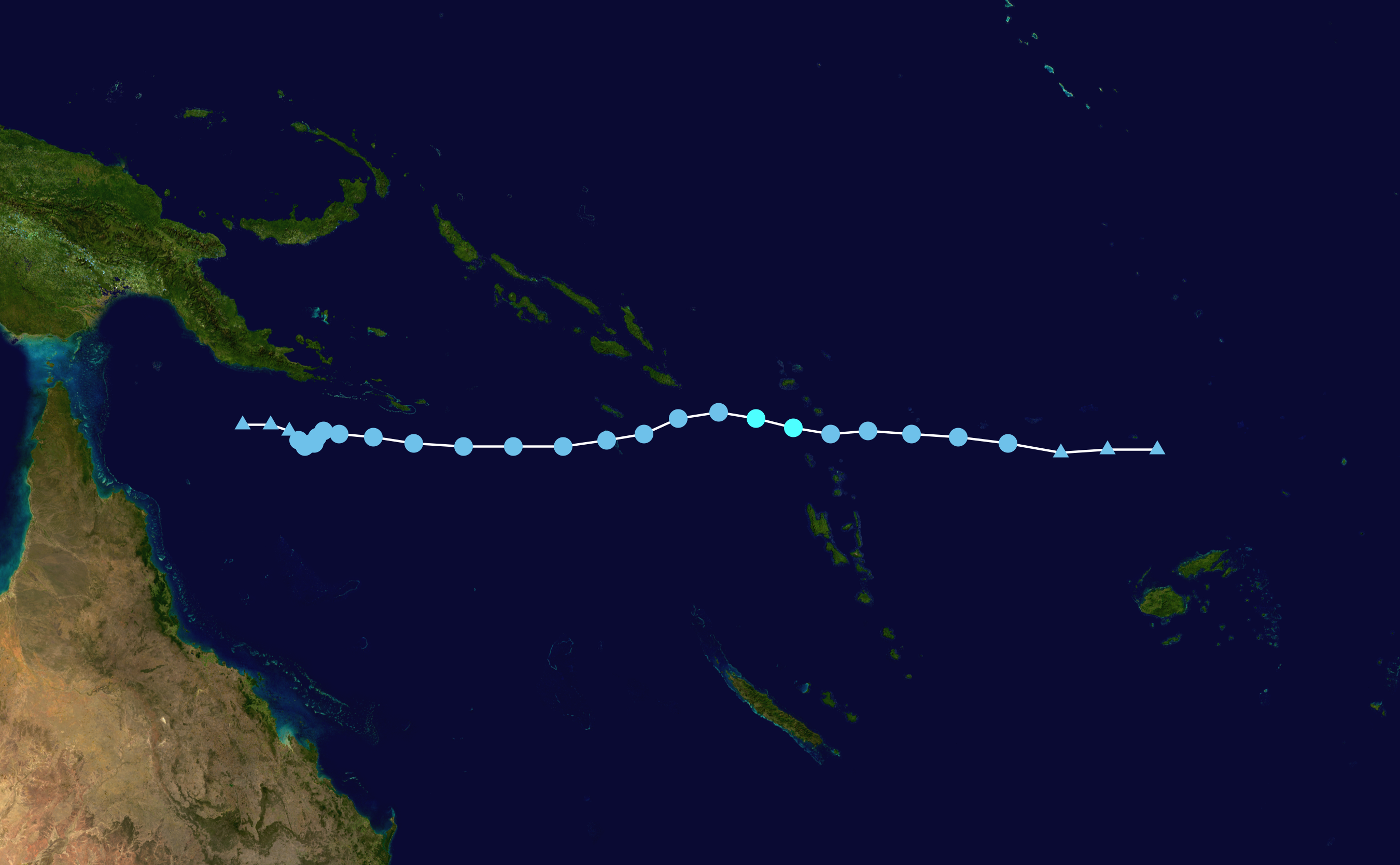
- Duration: May 6 – May 9 (Exited basin)
- Peak intensity: 55 km/h (35 mph) (10-min); 997 hPa (mbar)

Tropical Depression 28P developed on May 6 and then exited the basin on May 9.

== Other systems ==
According to TCWC Nadi, a tropical depression existed between May 28 and May 30, to the far west of Fiji, with the associated rainband of the storm located over Fiji between May 27 and May 31. The associated rainband caused some flooding in low-lying areas on the island of Viti Levu.

== Season effects ==
This table lists all the storms that developed in the South Pacific to the east of longitude 160°E during the 1989–90 season. It includes their intensity on the Australian tropical cyclone intensity scale, duration, name, landfalls, deaths, and damages. All data is taken from the warning centers from the region unless otherwise noted.

Name	Dates	Peak intensity			Areas affected	Damage (USD)	Deaths	Ref(s).
Name	Dates	Category	Wind speed	Pressure	Areas affected	Damage (USD)	Deaths	Ref(s).
Eseta	December 15 – 28	Category 2 tropical cyclone	100 km/h (65 mph)	985 hPa (29.09 inHg)	Vanuatu, New Caledonia, Fiji, New Zealand	>$25,000	None	
Delilah	January 1 – 4	Category 2 tropical cyclone	110 km/h (70 mph)	975 hPa (28.79 inHg)	New Caledonia, New Zealand		2	
Fili	January 1 – 8	Category 2 tropical cyclone	95 km/h (60 mph)	985 hPa (29.09 inHg)	None	None	None	
Gina	January 6 – 9	Category 1 tropical cyclone	85 km/h (50 mph)	987 hPa (29.15 inHg)	Samoa	$5 million		
Harry	February 8 – 23	Category 4 severe tropical cyclone	165 km/h (105 mph)	940 hPa (27.76 inHg)	New Caledonia			
TD	February 9 – 28	Tropical Depression	Not Specified	Not Specified	Fiji		9	
Hinano	February 21 – March 1	Category 3 severe tropical cyclone	150 km/h (90 mph)	970 hPa (28.64 inHg)	French Polynesia			
Ivy	February 21 – March 3	Category 3 severe tropical cyclone	155 km/h (100 mph)	960 hPa (28.35 inHg)	New Caledonia, Vanuatu			
Judy	February 22 – 28	Category 3 severe tropical cyclone	150 km/h (90 mph)	965 hPa (28.50 inHg)				
Kerry	March 29 – April 4	Category 2 tropical cyclone	95 km/h (60 mph)	985 hPa (29.09 inHg)	Fiji			
Lili	April 6 – April 13	Category 3 severe tropical cyclone	150 km/h (90 mph)	955 hPa (28.20 inHg)	New Caledonia			
Meena	May 1 – 5	Category 1 tropical cyclone	75 km/h (45 mph)	990 hPa (29.23 inHg)	Solomon Islands	Minor	None	
Ernie	May 6 – 9	Tropical Depression	55 km/h (35 mph)	997 hPa (29.44 inHg)				
TD	May 28 – 30	Tropical Depression	Not Specified	Not Specified	None	None	None	
Season aggregates
14 systems	November 23 – May 30		140 km/h (85 mph)	960 hPa (28.35 inHg)		>$5.03 million	2	

== See also ==
- List of off-season South Pacific tropical cyclones
- Atlantic hurricane seasons: 1988, 1989
- Pacific hurricane seasons: 1988, 1989
- Pacific typhoon seasons: 1988, 1989
- North Indian Ocean cyclone seasons: 1988, 1989
