= Dalida María Benfield =

Panamanian-American media artist, researcher, and writer

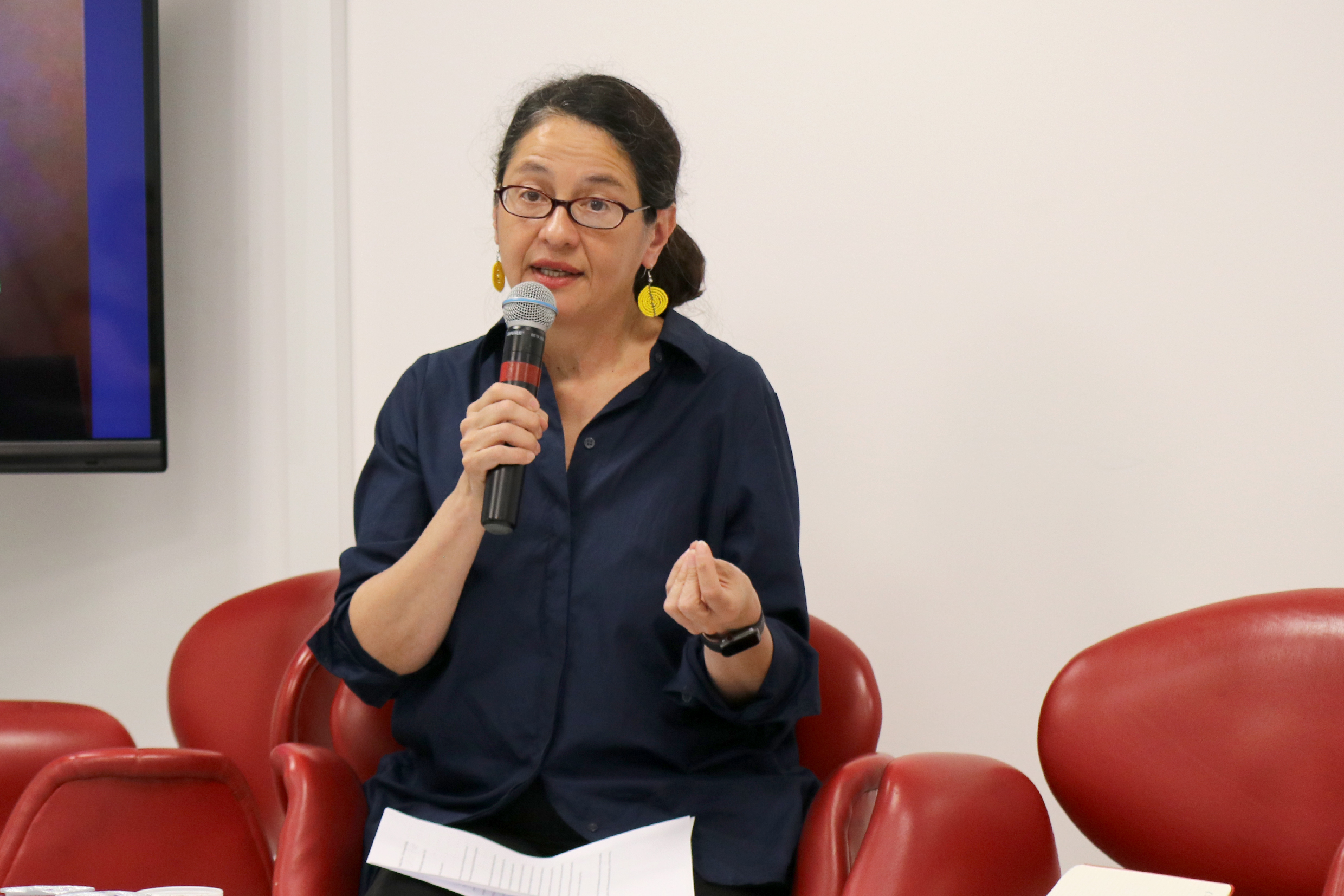
- Education: Tisch School of the Arts, NYU; University of California, Berkeley; Harvard University
- Known for: Media artist Researcher; Writer

Dalida María Benfield is a media artist, researcher, and writer. In Benfield's research-based artistic and collective practices, she produces video, installation, archives, artists' books, workshops, and other pedagogical and communicative actions, across online and offline platforms. She is currently faculty in the Vermont College of Fine Arts MFA in Visual Arts program, and was a Research Fellow and Faculty Associate at the Berkman Center for Internet and Society at Harvard University (2011–2015).

== Education ==
Benfield holds a Ph.D. (2011) from the University of California-Berkeley in Ethnic Studies with Designated Emphasis in Gender, Women and Sexuality Studies, and an MFA (1989) from the School of the Art Institute of Chicago.

== Work ==
Dalida María Benfield's research engages questions of gender and the geo-politics of knowledge in the work of contemporary digital media artists and activists. Built from decolonial theory, transnational feminist methodology, and the sociology of global flows of information, her research and practice have resulted in the concept of "decolonial media aesthetics." Her research and writing projects have specifically taken up critical engagements with gender, race, technology, and discourses of development; artists' and activists' iteration of technology as social and epistemic interventions; and open knowledge and digital humanities, including the development of new online platforms for art, feminist research, and video archives. Her recent work has addressed the work of individual artists, such as Michelle Dizon, Fabiano Kueva, Enrique Castro Ríos, Cao Fei, and artists' collectives, including the Raqs Media Collective; as well as activist media during the global Occupy movement, the Egyptian revolution, and the global environmental and water rights movements.

A recent work of Benfield's, losarchivosdelcuerpo [body files] uses a feminist aesthetics and poetics of re-embodiment of knowledge and knowledge sharing in the mediated shadows of colonialisms. The collective project, with work contributed by international artists and authors, exhibited most recently at Huret & Spector Gallery, Emerson College, Boston (April 2015); and SALASAB, Bogotá, Colombia (October 2015), co-designed with the artist Robert Ochshorn (US/Germany) takes the form of an open access archive of art and writing, an installation of video, photographs, and drawings, as well as a video screening series, workshops, and print publications. The

== Videos of lectures/conversations ==
- "CoLLEctive NoW: Artists on the Collective Present." Invited speaker and convener of roundtable, with Robert Sember (Ultra-red), Beatriz Santiago-Muñoz (Beta-local), Salome Chasnoff (Beyond Media), Sasha Sumner (Hungry March Band), and Kim Hou (M.E.I. Collectif). The Feminist Art Project day of panels during the College Art Association Conference. Museum of Art and Design, NY, NY. February 2015.
- "Digital Natives." In Video Vortex 9 Hybrid Video Reader. The Institute of Network Cultures, Amsterdam. 2014.
- “Unexpected Development: Decolonial Media Aesthetics and Women’s ICT4D Video." Berkman Center for Internet and Society at Harvard University, Cambridge, MA. 2012.
- “El Aparato (De)Colonial: cambiar la ruta del Canal de Panamá." DeColonial Aesthetics Conference, Universidad Distrital Francisco José de Caldas and Museo de Arte Moderno-MAMBO, Bogotá, Colombia. 2010.

== Interviews ==
- Grznic, M., Smid, A., and Simcic, Z. Decoloniality (Images of Struggle). Interview in film, 2011.
- Ree, M. "producing a [feminist] [decolonial] [multiple] world through a frame: Dalida Maria Benfield." In HASTAC (Humanities, Arts, Science, and Technology Advanced Collaborative) Forum, December 6, 2011.

== Publications ==
- Cornejo, K. "The Question of Central American-Americans in Latino Art and Pedagogy." In Aztlan Journal, 2015.
- Chavez, B. "Decolonial Aesthesis: Arte Nuevo InteractivA and A New Generation of Decolonial Thinkers, Makers and Doers." In E-Misférica 11.1 El Gesto Decolonial, 2014.
- Rojas-Sotelo, M. "Decolonial Aesthesis at the 11th Havana Biennial." In Social Text/Periscope, July 2013.
- Lasch, P. Grand Gestures and (Im)modest Proposals. OXC Press, 2013.
- List, C. Chicano Images: Refiguring Ethnicity in Mainstream Film. New York and London: Routledge, 2013 (republished 2013/2016).
- Peterson, M.A. “Book Review: Making Our Media...” In MedieKultur, 52, 185–188, 2012.
- Gomez, P., and Mignolo, W. “Estéticas Decoloniales: Sentir, Pensar, Hacer en Abya Yala y La Gran Comarca.” In Esteticas Decoloniales. Universidad Distrital Francisco José de Caldas. Bogotá, Colombia, 2011.
