= Dalilah (crater) =

Crater on Enceladus

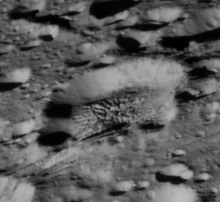
Cassini view of Dalilah Crater

Dalilah is a crater in the northern hemisphere of Saturn's moon Enceladus. Dalilah was first discovered in Voyager 2 images but was seen at much higher resolution by Cassini. It is located at 51.89°N 248.54°W and is 16 kilometers across. Fractures have deformed the south-eastern side of Dalilah as well as the dome at the center of the crater. This tectonic deformation was formed through viscous relaxation. Similar deformation is also seen on a slightly larger scale at Dunyazad crater.

Dalilah is named after a character from Arabian Nights, a crafty old crone who fools several men.
