= Dalila Paola Méndez =

Latina visual artist (born 1975)

Dalila Paola Méndez (born 1975), is an American visual artist of Guatemalan/Nicaraguan/Salvadoran descent.

Méndez's work incorporates painting, photography, and film. It explores themes of femininity, Latinidad, indigeneity, African diaspora, and queerness.

== Background and early life ==
Dalila Paola Méndez was born in Los Angeles, growing up in the Echo Park and Silver Lake neighborhoods. As a child, she spent many hours in Los Angeles' public libraries where she was introduced to different art forms. Méndez credits taking art classes at East Hollywood's Barnsdall Art Park for igniting her love for the arts. Her first medium was photography, using her 35mm camera to explore color and subjects.

Méndez earned her BA in International Relations from the University of Southern California. She worked as a bilingual teacher for the Los Angeles Unified School District, teaching English to children in immigrant communities. After leaving her teaching job, Méndez co-founded the Chicanx art collective Womyn Image Makers (WIM) with Aurora Guerrero and other Chicanx visual artists in 1999.

== Works ==
=== Paintings ===
- The Goddess Within (2009). Acrylic on lava rock canvas of a ceiba tree in the shape of a female body. Four female figures, a jaguar and a quetzal surround the ceiba tree presenting offerings.
- LA Re-Imagined (2010). Acrylic on canvas painting of Los Angeles' landscape. According to Micaela Jamaica Díaz-Sánchez, it blends the city's urban environment with the Salvadoran artisan rural aesthetics.
- We the Resilient (2020). Mixed media on canvas. A collage celebrating the lives of Breonna Taylor, George Floyd, Andres Guardado and other victims of criminal violence by police.
- Feliciano Ama is portraying one of the leaders of the Salvadoran Civil War in a rebellion against the government's repression of political freedoms and perceived election fraud; the painting is described as "...evoking the memory of Ama's hanging...without a noose and without bound hands." Mendez is described as letting Feliciano Ama "...embody his role as a community spiritual leader..." the way he had in the Salvadoran Civil War. Mendez uses "...ancestral narratives [to explore] indigenous connections [and then] reinterpret and navigate issues confronting communities of color" by "...visually [narrating] stories of resilience..." through subjects like the LGBTQ community and the environment. Through words like these, she is also credited as having inspired others like Micaela Jamaica Díaz-Sánchez to use her works to "...reimagine the sociological, political [and] cultural..." themes to represent the variations of experiences and history among those that are of "...immigrant, and working-class Latina positionalities." Through her work, she also hopes to express the legacy she describes as a reflection of their "...working-class backgrounds..."

=== Film ===
Dalila Méndez has worked on several films as both production designer and art director. Since the early 2000s, Méndez has collaborated with fellow Womyn Image Makers (WIM) filmmakers, like Aurora Guerrero, on several projects.

- Pura Lengua (2005). Set in Los Angeles, the film tells the story of a queer Latina poet's experience navigating violence in her community.
- Viernes Girl (2005). The film explores a week in the life of two Salvadoran siblings.
- Mosquita y Mari (2012). Set in Hunting Park, the film explores identity, gender, and sexuality through the relationship of two young Chicanx girls.
