= List of storms named Delilah =

The name Delilah has been used for four tropical cyclones worldwide, one in the Western Pacific Ocean, two in the Australian Region and one South Pacific Ocean.

In the Western Pacific:

- Tropical Storm Delilah (1950) – a strong tropical storm that affected the Philippines.

In the Australian region:

- Cyclone Delilah (1967)
- Cyclone Delilah (1989)

In the South Pacific Ocean:

- Cyclone Delilah (1960)
