= Ahmad (crater) =

Crater on Enceladus

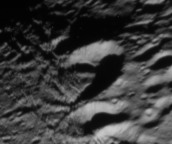
- Location: 58.76°N 311.57°W
- Diameter: 18.7 km
- Discoverer: Voyager 2
- Naming: Ahmed; Prince

Ahmad is a crater in the northern hemisphere of Saturn's moon Enceladus. Ahmad was first discovered in Voyager 2 images but was seen at much higher resolution, though near the terminator, by Cassini. It is located at 58.8° North Latitude, 311.6° West Longitude and is 18.7 kilometers across. The western portion of the crater is largely absent, either buried or disrupted by the eastern margin of Samarkand Sulci. A large, dome-like structure occupies the interior of the crater, caused by infill of material from Samarkand Sulci or from viscous relaxation.

Ahmad is named after a hero of one of the tales from the Arabian Nights. He brings his father an apple and marries Peri-Banu.
