= Arabian Nights (miniseries) =

- Poster for the miniseries, designed by Drew Struzan
- Genre: Miniseries; Fantasy; Costume drama
- Based on: The Book of the Thousand Nights and a Night by Sir Richard Francis Burton
- Screenplay by: Peter Barnes
- Directed by: Steve Barron
- Starring: John Leguizamo; Jason Scott Lee; Rufus Sewell; Mili Avital; Dougray Scott
- Theme music composer: Richard Harvey
- Countries of origin: United States; United Kingdom
- Original language: English
- No. of episodes: 2

Production
- Producer: Dyson Lovell
- Cinematography: Remi Adefarasin
- Running time: 175 minutes
- Production companies: Hallmark Entertainment; Babelsberg Studio; RTL Group

Original release
- Network: ABC; BBC One
- Release: April 30 – May 1, 2000

Arabian Nights is a two-part 2000 miniseries, adapted by Peter Barnes from Sir Richard Francis Burton's translation of the medieval epic One Thousand and One Nights and directed by Steve Barron. It was produced by Hallmark Entertainment and originally broadcast over two nights on 30 April and 1 May 2000 on BBC One in the United Kingdom and ABC in the United States.

The series consists of five stories from One Thousand and One Nights, which are framed within a sixth, maintaining the traditional style of stories within stories that is synonymous with the Nights. The series cast includes John Leguizamo, Jason Scott Lee, Rufus Sewell, Mili Avital and Dougray Scott.

== Synopsis ==
=== Frame story ===
The series starts in Baghdad at an undetermined time. Shahryar, Sultan of Baghdad, has gone mad after accidentally killing his treacherous wife five years earlier during a failed coup d'état, which his wife had planned with her secret lover, Shahryar's brother Schahzenan. In his madness, Shahryar now believes that all women want to kill him, but the law states that the Sultan must be married again or the throne will be passed to his brother. Shahryar has therefore ordered his Grand Vizier Ja'Far to bring him one of his concubines from the harem to marry and then have executed the next morning.

In order to prevent this, the Grand Vizier's clever daughter Scheherazade decides to marry the Sultan herself; Scheherazade (a childhood friend of the Sultan who has secretly fallen in love with him since then) formulates a plan to prevent her execution, and at the same time cure the Sultan of his madness. With the help of some tutoring from a bazaar storyteller, Scheherazade (an already-avid lover of stories and of the lessons they can teach) tells the Sultan a story every night, stopping at dawn with a cliffhanger, and then refusing to continue until dusk. Shahryar must therefore let Scheherazade live for another day in order to hear the rest of the story. Cunningly, Scheherazade has hidden a moral within every story, to help coax the Sultan out of his madness.

Meanwhile, Schahzenan learns about the Sultan's madness and that he is unable to execute his new wife. Perceiving this as weakness, Schahzenan decides to lead his army to Baghdad in an attempt to take the throne by force. However, by the time Schahzenan's army reaches the city, Scheherazade's plan has worked. As a result of her stories, Shahryar has overcome his madness and has fallen in love with Scheherazade. Using strategies inspired from elements from the stories, Shahryar is able to defeat his brother's army.

At the end of the battle, it is revealed that all that had been seen was a story itself, recounted by Scheherazade to her children. The series ends with Scheherazade promising to tell her children another story tomorrow night.

=== Scheherazade's stories ===
==== Ali Baba and the Forty Thieves ====
The first story told by Scheherazade is that of Ali Baba and the Forty Thieves. Ali Baba is a poor peasant from Damascus who finds a magical cave where the loot is stolen by the Forty Thieves, a tribe of murderous bandits that have plagued the kingdom. Using the magic words "Open Sesame!", Ali enters the cave and takes the treasure. When Ali tells his brother Cassim about the cave, Cassim demands his own share and goes to the cave himself where he is discovered and killed by the leader of the Forty Thieves, the infamous Black Coda.

Ali Baba finds Cassim's body hung-up by the Forty Thieves as a warning to others. With the help of his newly hired servant, Morgiana, Ali takes down the body and gives Cassim a lavish funeral. This alerts Black Coda and the Forty Thieves to the fact that Cassim was not alone in taking their treasure.

Black Coda discovers that Ali Baba and Morgiana are living in a lubricious estate in Damascus and devises a plan to kill all in the household. The Forty Thieves enter the city hidden in oil barrels which are placed outside Ali's estate where they wait for nightfall. Before they can strike, Morgiana discovers the barrels and rolls them down to the bottom of a hill where the dazed Forty Thieves are arrested (and later hanged) by the city guards, although Black Coda escapes.

To celebrate their victory, Ali Baba hosts a feast. Morgiana performs an exotic dance for Ali Baba during which she stabs one of the guests, killing him. She removes the man's false beard, revealing him to be Black Coda. Awed by her loyalty, Ali Baba marries Morgiana.

==== The Tale of the Poor Hunchback ====
Faisal, a tailor from Constantinople, designs Morgiana's wedding dress and attends the wedding with his wife Safil. Back in Constantinople, the couple have dinner with Bac-Bac, the Sultan's hunchbacked jester, during which Bac-Bac chokes on a fishbone and dies. Knowing that he was a favorite of the Sultan, they leave the body on the doorstep of a Jewish physician, Ezra Ben Ezra. Ezra trips over the body in the dark, falls down the stairs and assumes that he killed Bac-Bac in the fall. He drops the body down the chimney of a Chinese neighbor, Hi-Ching. Hi-Ching mistakes the body for a robber, attacks it with Kung Fu and believes that he killed Bac-Bac. He throws the body at a passing drunken Englishman, Jerome, who thinks he is being attacked and beats the body while calling for guards. The guards arrest Jerome for murder.

Jerome is put on trial and sentenced to death. Hi-Ching, Ezra and Faisal cannot bear the injustice and confess to killing the hunchback. The Sultan enters the court and, seeing that Bac-Bac's death was an accident, acquits them all and says that the jester would have found the drama amusing.

==== Aladdin and the Magic Lamp ====
This story tells the classic tale of Aladdin, a Chinese thief living in Samarkand. While fleeing authorities for pick-pocketing, he sees a carriage and blocks its path. The carriage windows open to reveal the beautiful Princess Zubaïda. The two see each other and fall in love.

While escaping, Aladdin meets a mysterious African traveler named Mustappa, who claims to have been a friend of Aladdin's father and is willing to pay him a high price to do a 'simple' task. Aladdin agrees and meets Mustappa at the entrance of the Cave of Wonders. Mustappa gives Aladdin a ring, and swears "by Hector's feathers", that Aladdin will not see his wedding day if he betrays Mustappa.

Aladdin enters the Cave and walks through a Terracotta Army until he finds the lamp. He races back to the entrance, where Mustappa asks Aladdin to give him the lamp before he helps him out. Aladdin refuses, believing Mustappa will take the lamp and leave him in the cave. Mustappa, enraged, closes the cave's entrance and abandons Aladdin, just as the Terracotta warriors come to life. In desperation, Aladdin rubs Mustappa's ring and summons the neurotic Genie of the Ring who reluctantly frees Aladdin from the cave.

Back home with his mother, Aladdin wonders why Mustappa would want a worthless old oil lamp. Rubbing it frees the Lamp Genie an incredibly powerful and intimidating spirit who can grant Aladdin's wishes. Aladdin and his mother wish to become royalty and for a fortune which they use to buy their way into the Royal Court. Aladdin asks the Caliph for Princess Zubaïda's hand in marriage, but he is turned down as the Princess is betrothed to Gulnare, the oafish son of the Caliph's vizier.

Aladdin discovers that the Princess is in love with him and using the Lamp Genie, he is able to humiliate Zubaïda's betrothed on their wedding night to prevent the marriage from being consummated, by trapping the vizier's son in a foul-smelling privy, and then marry the Princess himself after her furious father annuls the marriage. In Africa, Mustappa realizes that Aladdin is alive and has married as his pet raven, Hector, loses all his feathers. Mustappa goes to Samarkand dressed as a merchant trading new lamps for old ones, prompting a servant in Aladdin's palace to give the magic lamp to the Mustappa. Once the lamp comes into Mustappa's possession, he wishes to undo all Aladdin's wealth. Using the Genie of the Ring, Aladdin challenges Mustappa to a fight to the death with their magic. Each Genie transforms into one beast after another, until the Ring Genie is trapped in a giant mousetrap. Although Mustappa appears to have won, Aladdin is still a thief and is able to pick-pocket Mustappa, taking the Lamp and thus stealing his victory. Reunited with his mother and Zubaïda, Aladdin grants both the Genies their freedom, though only the Genie of the Ring accepts the offer.

==== The Sultan and the Beggar ====
Sultan Haroun Abraschild, a player of practical jokes, meets the drunken beggar Amin at a tavern while in disguise. Amin brags that he could do a better job as Sultan and then passes out. Haroun takes him to the palace and has him shaved, cleaned and laid in his bedchamber. When Amin awakens bewildered, Haroun's chief advisors tell Amin that he is Sultan Haroun. Amin's initial shock fades as he enjoys the palace's comforts. The advisors accompany him to court, where the pretense continues with Haroun watching the charade giddily from hiding places. Amin orders sweeping policy changes, leading the Grand Vizier to remark that Haroun had not done as much in years. Haroun sneers jealously and has Amin drugged before returning him to the streets as a beggar, where he is taken for mad and imprisoned. Some time later Haroun decides to repeat the joke. This time Amin hears Haroun laughing from his hiding place, believes it is a demon, and stabs him through the wall. The advisors decide to keep his death a secret and recognize Amin as the Sultan to avoid a civil war.

At the end of the story, as his brother's army approaches Baghdad, Sultan Shahryar realizes he is in love with Scheherazade and has been cured of his madness, but Scheherazade feels Shahryar needs to hear one more story before he goes into battle.

==== The Three Princes ====
The last story told by Scheherazade is about the sons of the long-suffering Sultan of Yemen: Prince Ali, Prince Ahmed, and Prince Hussain. The three are each gifted fighters and fight each other over the smallest of matters. Both their parents believe that when the Sultan dies, the sons will fight each other for the throne and will destroy the kingdom. After causing chaos in the city by fighting over a Princess, their father challenges each of his sons to bring him what they believe is the most precious object in the world, giving them one year to complete their quest.

Ali heads north to a brazen kingdom and finds a powerful telescope. Ahmed travels east to a mountain Buddhist monastery which possess a mystic apple (the Apple of Life), which when eaten can heal any wound or illness and earns it when he passes a secret test of character. The last brother, Hussain, travels west to the underground city of Petra. He wanders through the underground market looking for the most precious thing in the world, eventually finding a flying carpet.

The journeys of the brothers take up the given year, and all three meet at the Traveller's Rest. Ali's telescope reveals that their father is on his deathbed. The brothers race back to Yemen on Hussain's carpet to save their father with Ahmed's apple of life.

Scheherazade explains that as a result of their adventures, when the brothers eventually succeed their father, they rule the kingdom together in peace and harmony.

== Cast ==
- Mili Avital as Scheherazade
- Dougray Scott as Shahryar and Amin the Beggar
- Alan Bates as The Storyteller
- James Frain as Schahzenan and Sultan Haroun Abraschild (character based on the historical Caliph Harun al-Rashid)
- Peter Guinness as The Chief Executioner
- Jason Scott Lee as Aladdin
- Pik-Sen Lim as Aladdin's Mother
- John Leguizamo as The Genie of the Lamp and The Genie of the Ring
- Vanessa-Mae as Princess Zubaïda
- Hugh Quarshie as Mustappa
- Jim Carter as Ja'Far
- Amira Casar as Morgiana
- Rufus Sewell as Ali Baba
- Tchéky Karyo as Black Coda
- Andy Serkis as Kasim
- Alexis Conran as Prince Ali
- James Callis as Prince Ahmed
- Hari Dhillon as Prince Hussain
- Alexei Sayle as BacBac
- Ayesha Dharker as Coral Lips
- John Hallam as Demon
- Jamila Massey as Safil
- Nadim Sawalha as Judge Zadic
- Leon Lissek as Dr. Ezra
- Junix Inocian as Hi-Ching
- Stanley Lebor as Faisal
- Jane Lapotaire as Miriam
- Stefan Kalipha as Abu Nouz
- Benedict Wong as Hassan
- Inday Ba as Heart's Delight
- Melanie Gutteridge as Fair Face
- Burt Kwouk as Kaliph Beder
- Henry Goodman as Sultan Billah
- Tony Osoba as Sultan Badr Al-Din
- Roger Hammond as Jerome Gribben
- Kulvinder Ghir as Ali's Servant
- David Yip as Assad
- Don Warrington as Hari Ben Karim
- Cyril Nri as Schaca
- Adrian Pang as Gulnare
- Oded Fehr as Robber #2
- Peter Bayliss as 1st Physician
- Hassani Shapi as 1st Army Captain

== Filming ==
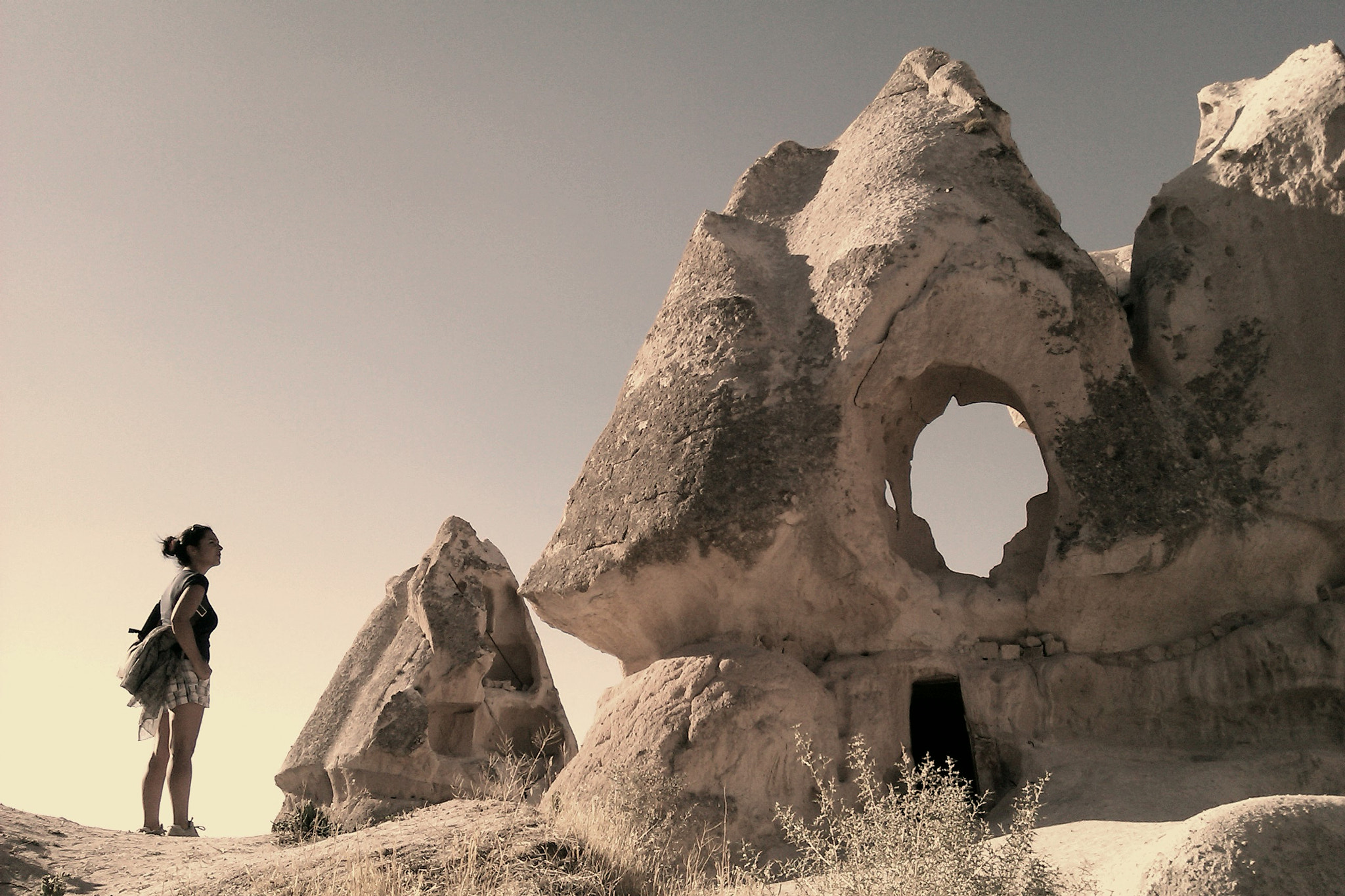
This structure in Uçhisar, Cappadocia, Turkey doubled as the home of Ali Baba

=== Locations ===
Arabian Nights was filmed on location in Turkey and Morocco and at Antalya Film Studios, Turkey.

== Critical reception ==
Variety wrote "Lush, lavish and longer than necessary, ABC’s “Arabian Nights” is definitely an appealing spectacle but overly sluggish in too many places"; whereas TV Guide wrote "Gracefully directed and lavishly mounted, this delicious adaptation bears the earmarks of a sturdy classic."

== Honors and awards ==
Year	Ceremony	Category	Result
2000	Artios	Best Casting for TV Miniseries	Won
2000	Emmy	Outstanding Makeup for a Miniseries, Movie or a Special	Won
2000	Emmy	Outstanding Art Direction for a Miniseries, Movie or a Special	Nominated
2000	Emmy	Outstanding Costumes for a Miniseries, Movie or a Special	Nominated
2000	Emmy	Outstanding Hairstyling for a Miniseries, Movie or a Special	Nominated
2000	Emmy	Outstanding Miniseries	Nominated
