= Diyar Planitia =

Region of relatively un-cratered terrain on Saturn's moon Enceladus

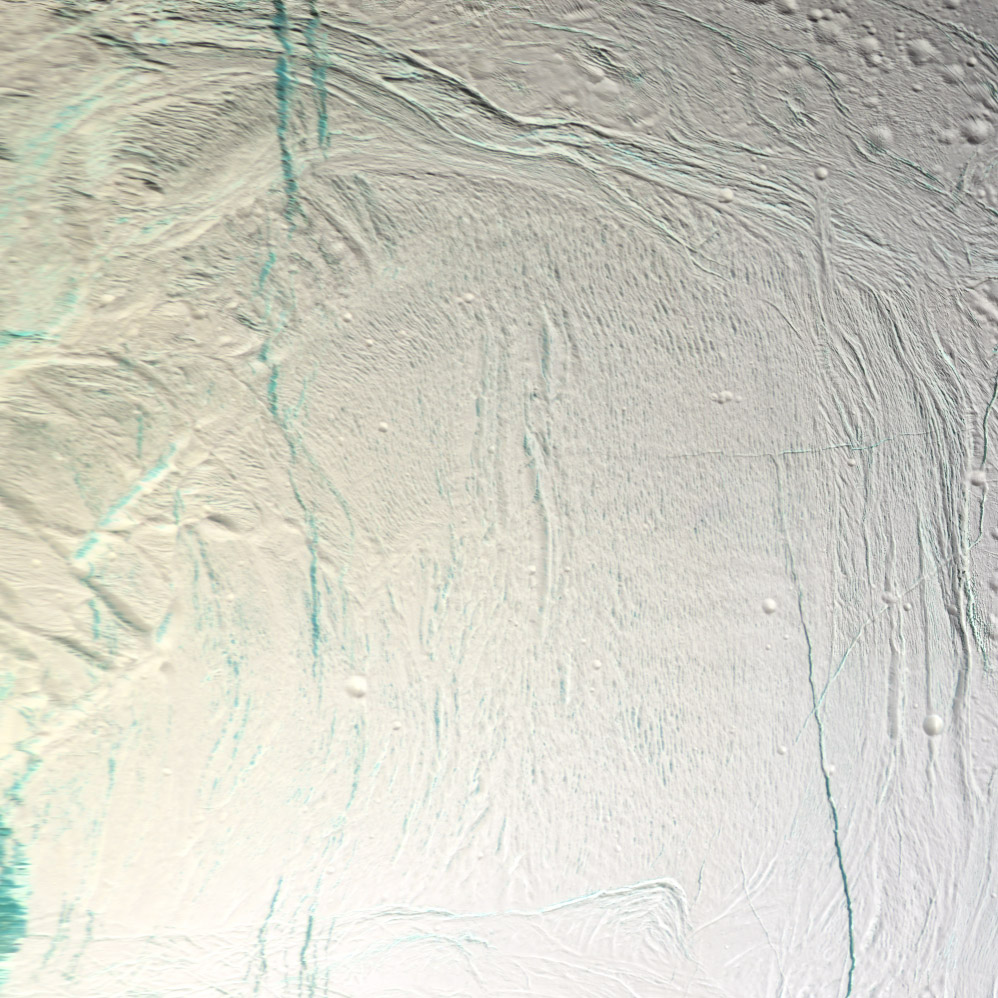
- Location: 0.5°N 239.7°W
- Discoverer: Voyager 2
- Naming: Khudadad's father's kingdom

Diyar Planitia is a region of relatively un-cratered terrain on Saturn's moon Enceladus. Its location is 0.5° North Latitude, 239.7° West Longitude while its being approximately 311 km across.

Images from the Voyager probes could not resolve whether Diyar Planitia is part of the ridged plains unit of Enceladus (Kargel and Pozio 1996) or the smooth plains unit (Rothery 1999), which is thought to be the youngest terrain on the moon. The more recent (and higher resolution) Cassini images show that Diyar is a region of relatively low, north–south trending ridges, with several younger fractures cutting across the region along the same trend. Very few impact craters have been found in Diyar, demonstrating the youthful age of the region.

Diyar Planitia is bounded on the north and east by a band of grooved terrain named Harran Sulci. Given the similarity in the spatial relationship between the Sarandib Planitia and Samarkand Sulci, it is likely that the formation of Diyar Planitia and Harran Sulci are related.

Diyar Planitia is named after the country that Khudadad's father rules in Arabian Nights.
