= Peri-Banu (crater) =

Crater on Enceladus

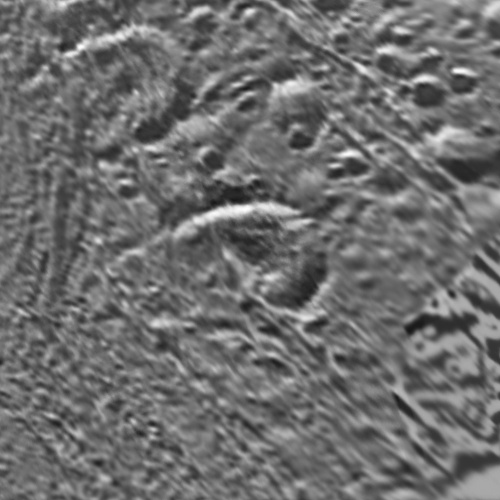
- Peri-Banu crater (center)
- Location: 62°N 322.91°W
- Diameter: 18 km
- Discoverer: Voyager 2
- Naming: Genie who marries Ahmed and helps him fulfill the demands of his father

Peri-Banu is a crater in the northern hemisphere of Saturn's moon Enceladus. Peri-Banu was first discovered in Voyager 2 images but was seen at much higher resolution, though near the terminator, by Cassini. It is located at 62° North Latitude, 322.9° West Longitude and is 18 kilometers across. The western portion of the crater is largely absent, either buried or disrupted by the eastern margin of Samarkand Sulci. A large, dome-like structure occupies the interior of the crater, caused by infill of material from Samarkand Sulci or from viscous relaxation.

The name comes from Pari-Banou, a genie-woman from one of the tales of the Arabian Nights; she is an incarnation of beauty who marries Ahmed and helps him fulfill the demands of his father.
