= Sarandib Planitia =

Region of relatively un-cratered terrain on Saturn's moon Enceladus

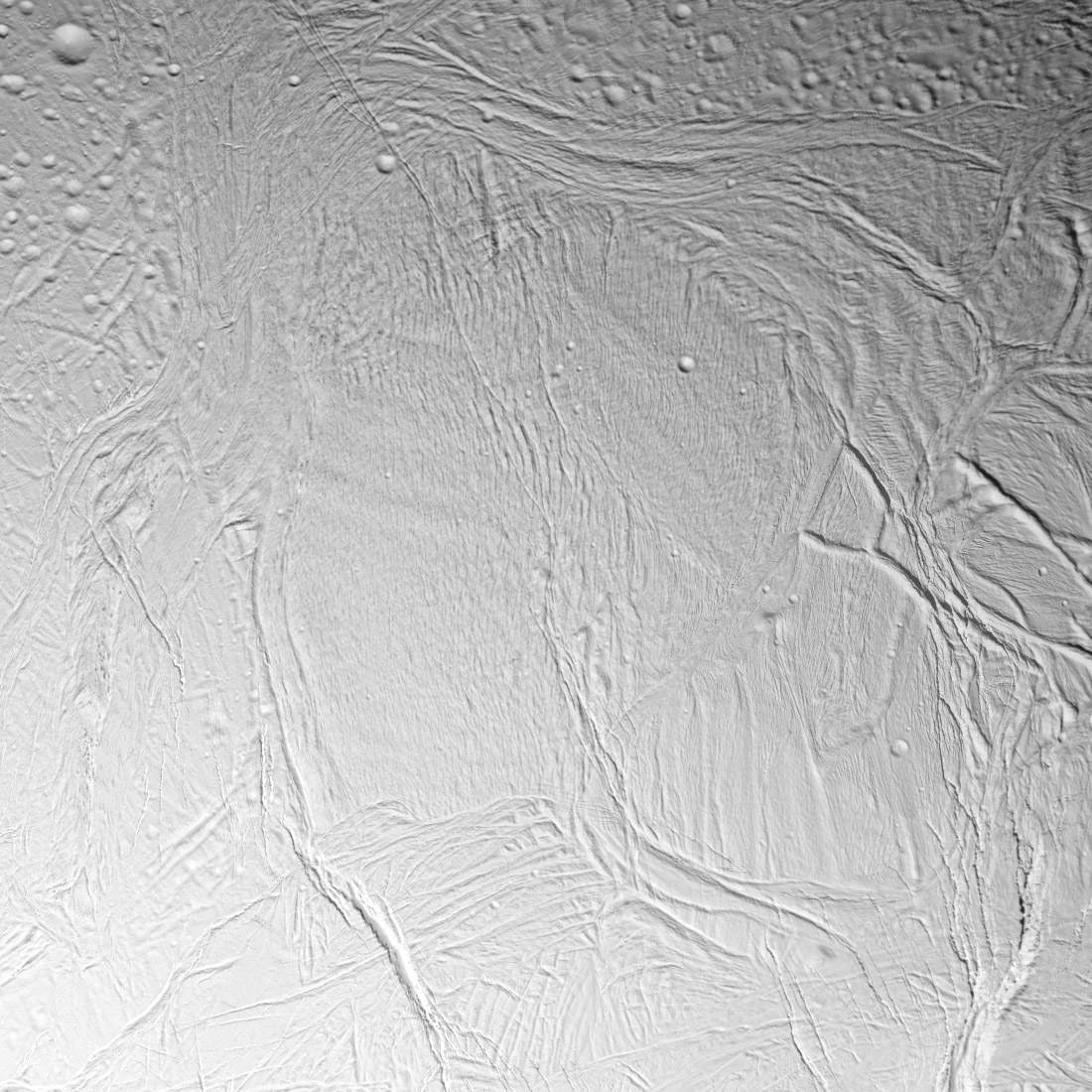
- Location: 4.4°N 298.0°W
- Discoverer: Voyager 2
- Naming: Sri Lanka, visited by Sindbad on his 6th Voyage

Sarandib Planitia is a region of relatively un-cratered terrain on Saturn's moon Enceladus. It is located at 4.4° North Latitude, 298.0° West Longitude and is approximately 200 km across. From Voyager images, Sarandib Planitia is considered part of either the ridged plains unit (Kargel and Pozio 1996) or smooth plains unit (Rothery 1999) of Enceladus, thought to be the youngest terrain on Enceladus. In more recent (and higher resolution) Cassini images, Sarandib is resolved into a region of relatively low ridges, with a band of rifted terrain cutting through the middle from northwest to southeast. In addition, a series of long-wavelength compression ridges are seen in the western portion of Sarandib Planitia, reminiscent of banded terrain on Europa, like Astypalaea Linea. Only approximately 20 craters larger than 1 kilometer across (the largest only 4.5 kilometers across) have been found in Sarandib, demonstrating the youthful age of the region.

Sarandib Planitia is bounded on the north and west by a band of grooved terrain named Samarkand Sulci. Given the similarity in the spatial relationship between the Diyar Planitia and Harran Sulci, it is likely that the formation of Sarandib Planitia and Samarkand Sulci are related.

Sarandib Planitia is named from the old Arabic/Persian/Urdu name for Sri Lanka, an island visited by Sindbad on his 6th voyage in Arabian Nights.
