= Harran Sulci =

Region of terrain on Saturn's moon Enceladus

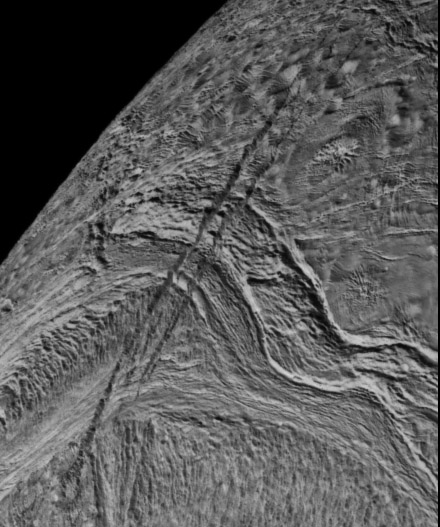
- Location: 26.7°N 237.6°W
- Length: 276 km
- Discoverer: Voyager 2
- Naming: City Khudadad's father ruled from

Harran Sulci is a region of grooved terrain on the surface of Saturn's moon Enceladus. The feature is centered at 26.7° North Latitude, 237.6° West Longitude and is approximately 276 kilometers long. Harran Sulci bounds Diyar Planitia to the north and east.

Using Voyager 2 images, Kargel and Pozio (1996) characterized Harran Sulci as consisting of sinuous "mountainous ridges" 1-1.5 km in height, and lying within relative topographic lows. Kargel and Pozio (1996) suggested that they might be fold belts, similar to North America's Appalachian Mountains.

Recent images by the Cassini spacecraft show of Harran Sulci at much higher resolution than in the Voyager 2 images. The feature has a convex cross-section with numerous ridges running down the length of the feature. Like Samarkand Sulci, tall scarps facing the feature separate the surrounding cratered terrain to the north, and Diyar Planitia to the south, from Harran Sulci. Near the western end of the feature, two deep fracture were observed running perpendicular to Harran. Similar, but smaller, fractures are seen running perpendicular to Samarkand Sulci, suggesting that a period of extension accompanies the later stages of formation (or occurs after formation) of these ridge belts.

Harran Sulci is named after the city in Arabian Nights where Khudadad's father ruled.
