= Samarkand Sulci =

Region of grooved terrain on the surface of Saturn's moon Enceladus

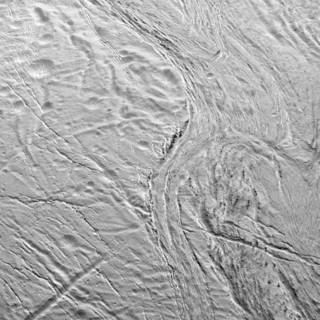
- Location: 30.5°N 326.8°W
- Length: 383 km
- Discoverer: Voyager 2
- Naming: Samarkand, Uzbekistan

Samarkand Sulci is a region of grooved terrain on the surface of Saturn's moon Enceladus. The feature is centered at 30.5° North Latitude, 326.8° West Longitude, and is approximately 383 kilometers long. Samarkand Sulci consists of three parts. The southern and eastern extensions bound Sarandib Planitia on its western and northern sides, respectively. The northern portions extends into a region of cratered terrain.

Using Voyager 2 images, Kargel and Pozio (1996) found that the northern and southern/eastern extensions of this feature are likely distinct features with different origins and ages. The portions surrounding Sarandib Planitia were characterized as sinuous "mountainous ridges" 1-1.5 km in height, and lying within relative topographic lows. Kargel and Pozio (1996) suggested that they might be fold belts, similar to North America's Appalachian Mountains. The northern portion of Samarkand Sulci was found to consist of linear fractures, suggesting that rather than a compressional fold belt, the northern part of Samarkand Sulci may in fact be an extensional rift. Based on analysis of crater counts in both areas of Samarkand Sulci, Kargel and Pozio (1996) suggested that the rift formed before the ridges.

Recent images by the Cassini spacecraft show portions of Samarkand Sulci at much higher resolution than in the Voyager 2 images. Numerous parallel ridges are resolved in the southern and eastern extensions of the feature, though some ridges appear chevron shaped. Just as Kargel and Pozio (1996) found parts of this feature lying within topographic lows, sharp scarps bound the ridge belts in several regions. On the far eastern tip of Samarkand Sulci, these scarps begin to converge as the ridge belts disappear, forming narrow canyons. Northern Samarkand Sulci was also observed. This region appears unconsolidated with several craters, like Ahmad and Peri-Banu, appearing to be cross-cut or even flooded by this portion of Samarkand Sulci.

Near the southern end of Samarkand Sulci, curious dark patches, 500–750 m across were observed lying along ridge crests. It is possible these spots may be collapse pits.

Samarkand Sulci is named after the country ruled over by Shah Zaman, brother of Shahryar, in Arabian Nights.
