= List of One Thousand and One Nights characters =

One Thousand and One Nights is a collection of folktales from the Middle East compiled in the Arabic language during the Islamic Golden Age. It is often known in English as The Arabian Nights. It consists of stories within a story; the frame story is "The Story of King Shahryar of Persia and His Brother" (or "The Story of King Shahryar and Queen Shahrazad"), in which Scheherazade tells tales to her husband Shahryar.

== Characters in the frame story ==
=== Scheherazade ===
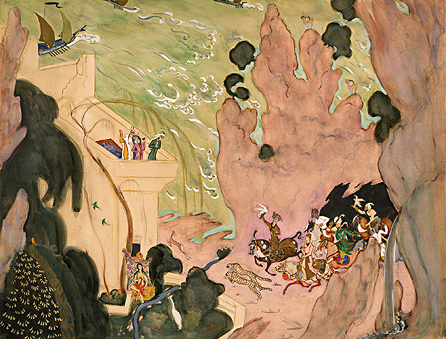
Scheherazade in the palace of her husband, Shahryar

Scheherazade or Shahrazad (Persian: شهرزاد, Šahrzād, or شهرزاد, Šahrāzād, lit. 'child of the city') is the legendary queen who is the storyteller and narrator of The Nights. She is the daughter of the kingdom's vizier and the elder sister of Dunyazad.

Against her father's wishes, she marries King Shahryar, who has vowed that he will execute a new bride every morning. For 1,001 nights, Scheherazade tells her husband a story, stopping at dawn with a cliffhanger. This forces the King to keep her alive for another day so that she can resume the tale at night.

The name derives from the Persian šahr (شهر, 'city') and -zâd (زاد, 'child of'); or from the Middle-Persian čehrāzād, wherein čehr means 'lineage' and āzād, 'noble' or 'exalted' (i.e. 'of noble or exalted lineage' or 'of noble appearance/origin'),

=== Dunyazad ===
Dunyazad (Persian: دنیازاد, Dunyāzād; aka Dunyazade, Dunyazatde, Dinazade, or Dinarzad) is the younger sister of Queen Scheherazade. In the story cycle, it is she who—at Scheherazade's instruction—initiates the tactic of cliffhanger storytelling to prevent her sister's execution by Shahryar. Dunyazad, brought to her sister's bedchamber so that she can say farewell before Scheherazade's execution the next morning, asks her sister to tell one last story. At the successful conclusion of the tales, Dunyazad marries Shah Zaman, Shahryar's younger brother.

She is recast as a major character as the narrator of the "Dunyazadiad" segment of John Barth's novel Chimera.

=== Scheherazade's father ===
Scheherazade's father, sometimes called Jafar (Persian: جعفر; Arabic: جَعْفَر, jaʿfar), is the vizier of King Shahryar. Every day, on the king's order, he beheads the brides of Shahryar. He does this for many years until all the unmarried women in the kingdom have either been killed or run away, at which point his own daughter Scheherazade offers to marry the king.

The vizier tells Scheherazade the Tale of the Bull and the Ass, in an attempt to discourage his daughter from marrying the king. It does not work, and she marries Shahryar anyway. At the end of the 1,001 nights, Scheherazade's father goes to Samarkand where he replaces Shah Zaman as sultan.

=== Shahryar ===
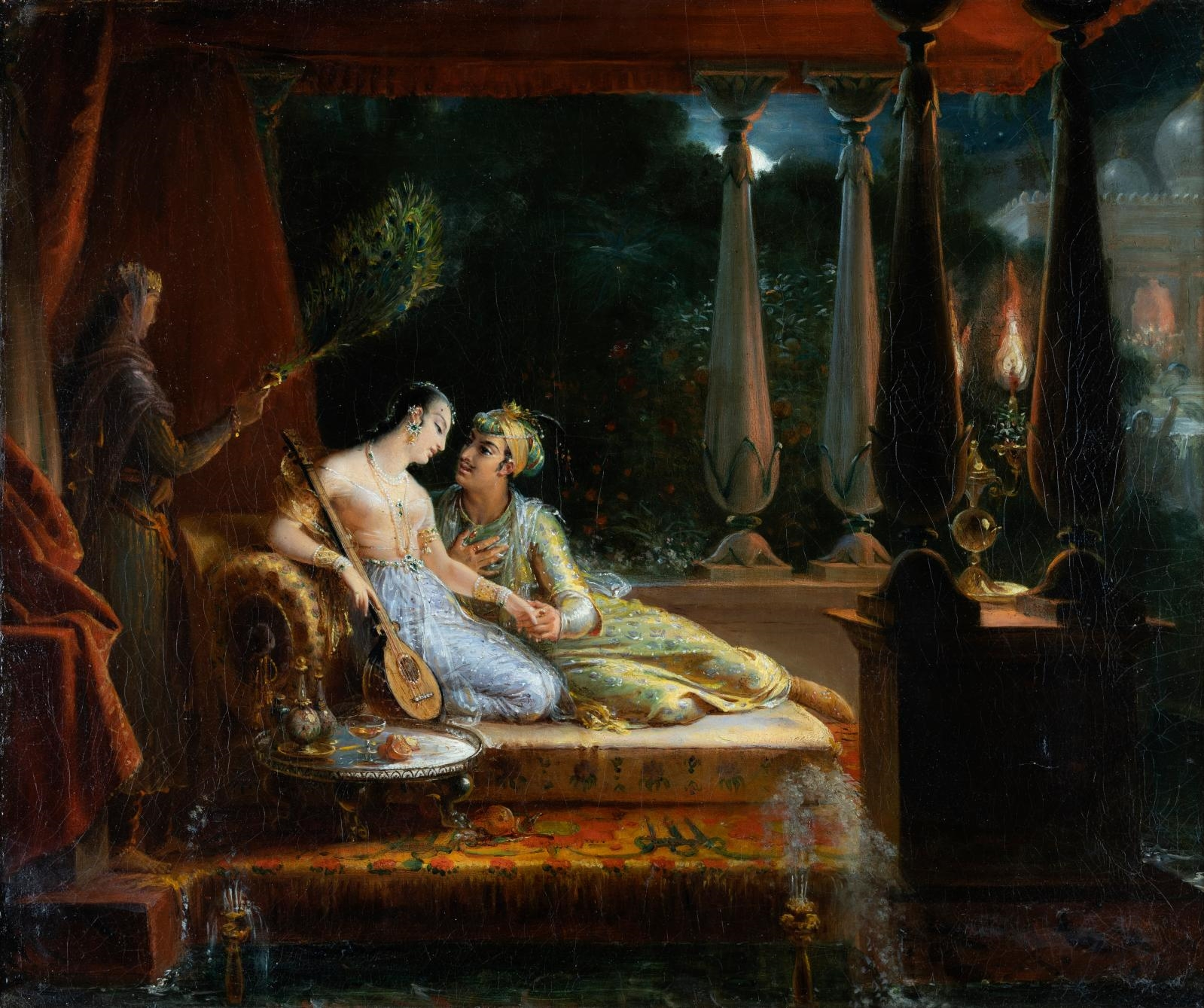
Marie-Éléonore Godefroid, Scheherazade and Shahryar, c. 1842

Shahryar (Persian: شهریار, Šahryār; also spelt Shahriar, Shariar, Shahriyar, Schahryar, Sheharyar, Shaheryar, Shahrayar, Shaharyar, or Shahrear), which is pronounced /ʃæh.ri.jɑːr/ in Persian, is the fictional Persian Sassanid King of Kings who is told stories by his wife, Scheherazade. He ruled over an empire extending to India, over all the adjacent islands and a great way beyond the Ganges as far as China, while Shahryar's younger brother, Shah Zaman ruled over Samarkand.

In the frame story, Shahryar is betrayed by his wife, which makes him believe that all women will, in the end, betray him. So every night for three years, he takes a wife and has her executed the next morning, until he marries Scheherazade, his vizier’s beautiful and clever daughter. For 1,001 nights in a row, Scheherazade tells Shahryar a story, each time stopping at dawn with a cliffhanger, thus forcing him to keep her alive for another day so that she can complete the tale the next night. After 1,001 stories, Scheherazade tells Shahryar that she has no more stories for him. Fortunately, during the telling of the stories, Shahryar has grown into a wise ruler and rekindles his trust in women.

The word šahryâr (Persian: شهریار) derives from the Middle Persian šahr-dār, 'holder of a kingdom' (i.e. 'lord, sovereign, king').

=== Shah Zaman ===
Shah Zaman or Schazzenan (Persian: شاهزمان, Šāhzamān) is the Sultan of Samarkand (aka Samarcande) and brother of Shahryar. Shah Zaman catches his first wife in bed with a cook and cuts them both in two. Then, while staying with his brother, he discovers that Shahryar's wife is unfaithful. At this point, Shah Zaman comes to believe that all women are untrustworthy and he returns to Samarkand where, as his brother does, he marries a new bride every day and has her executed before morning.

At the end of the story, Shahryār calls for his brother and tells him of Scheherazade's fascinating, moral tales. Shah Zaman decides to stay with his brother and marries Scheherazade's beautiful younger maiden sister, Dunyazad, with whom he has fallen in love. He is the ruler of Tartary from its capital Samarkand.

== Characters in Scheherazade's stories ==
=== Ahmed ===
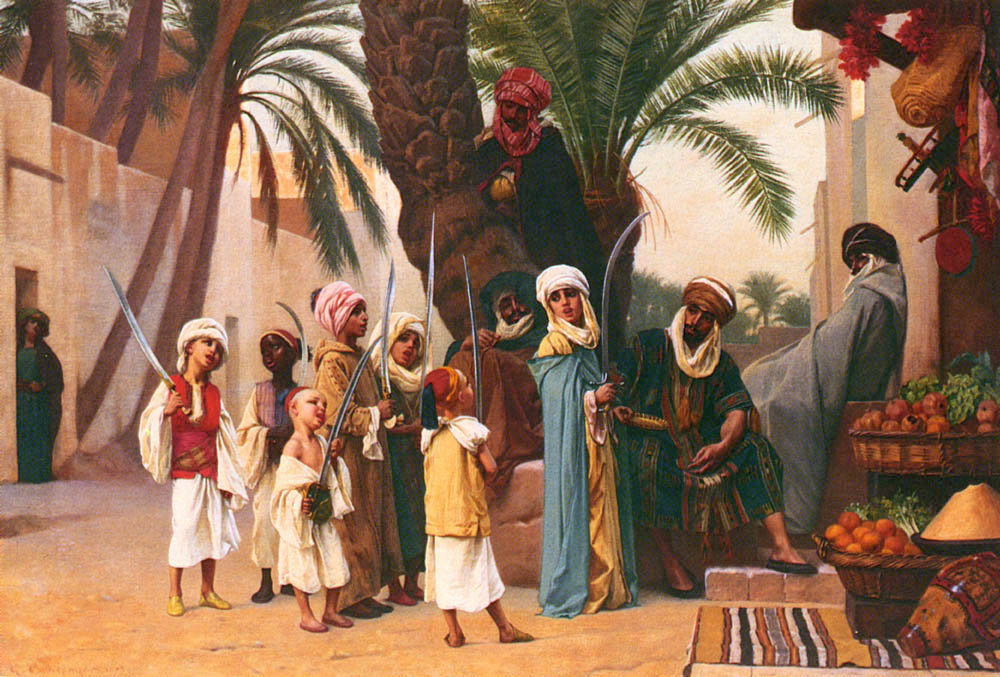
Sons of the Sultan of the Indies with scimitars. (from Gustave Boulanger's painting, A Tale of 1001 Nights)

Prince Ahmed (Arabic: أحمد, ʾaḥmad, 'thank, praise') is the youngest of three sons of the Sultan of the Indies. He is noted for having a magic tent that would expand so as to shelter an army, and contract so that it could go into one's pocket. Ahmed travels to Samarkand city and buys an apple that can cure any disease if the sick person smells it.

Ahmed rescues the Princess Paribanou (Persian: پریبانو, Parībānū; also spelled Paribanon or Peri Banu), a peri (female jinn).

=== Aladdin ===
Aladdin (Arabic: علاء الدين, ʿalāʾ ad-dīn) is one of the most famous characters in One Thousand and One Nights and appears in the famous tale of Aladdin and The Wonderful Lamp. Despite not being part of the original Arabic text of The Arabian Nights, the story of Aladdin is one of the best known tales associated with that collection, especially following the eponymous 1992 Disney film.

Composed of the words ʿalāʾ (عَلَاء, 'exaltation (of)') and ad-dīn (الدِّين, 'the religion'), the name Aladdin essentially means 'nobility of the religion'.

=== Ali Baba ===
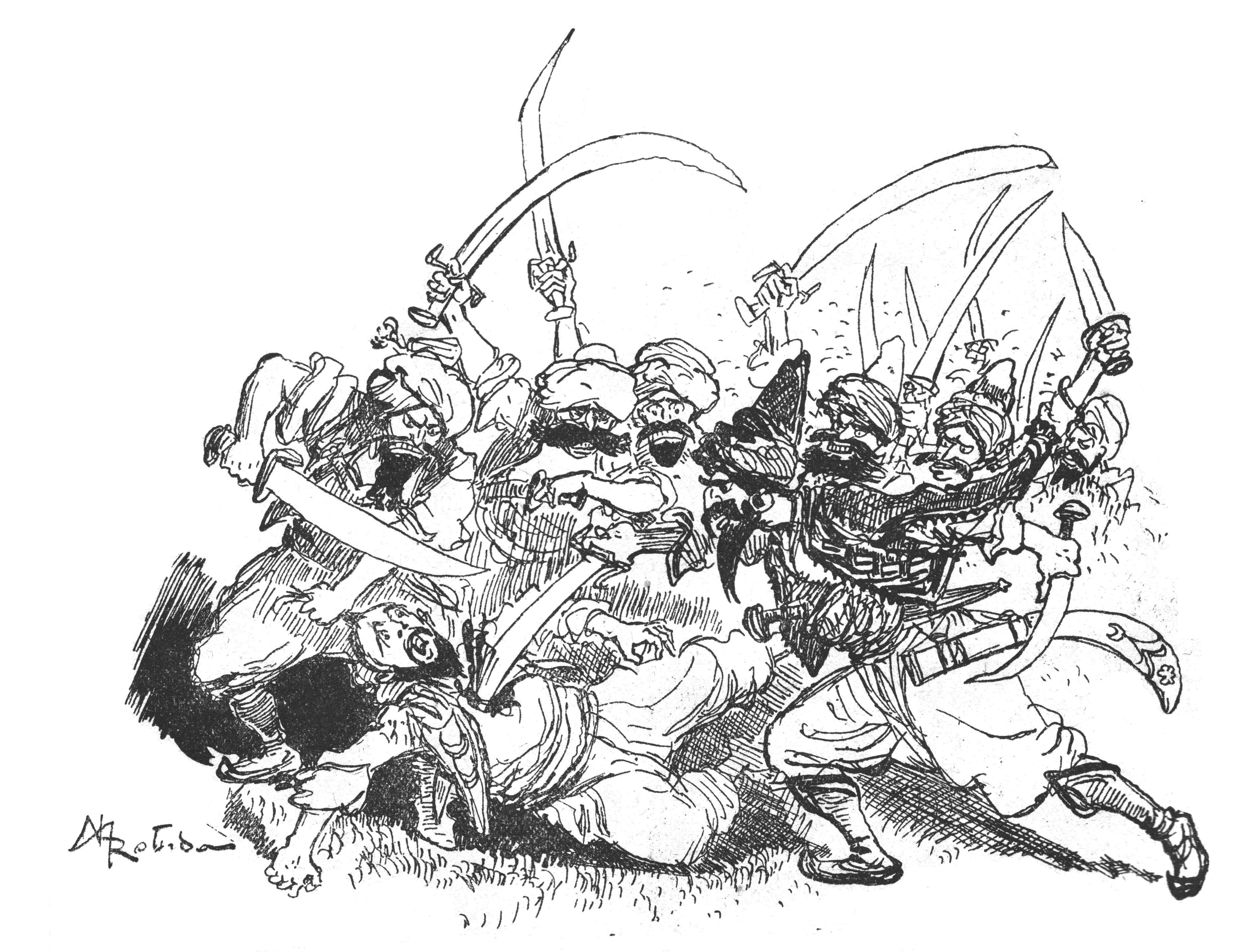
The Forty Thieves attack greedy Cassim when they find him in their secret magic cave.

Ali Baba (Arabic: علي بابا, ʿaliy bābā) is a poor wood cutter who becomes rich after discovering an immense treasure, hidden in a secret cave by forty evil thieves.

=== Ali Shar ===
Ali Shar (Arabic: علي شار) is a character in Ali Shar and Zumurrud who inherits a large fortune on the death of his father but very quickly squanders it all. He goes hungry for many months until he sees Zumurrud on sale in a slave market. Zumurrud gives Ali the money to buy her and the two live together and fall in love. A year later Zumurrud is kidnapped by a Christian and Ali spends the rest of the story finding her.

=== Ali ===
Prince Ali (Arabic: علي, ʿalīy; Persian: علی) is a son of the Sultan of the Indies. He travels to Shiraz, the capital of Persia, and buys a magic perspective glass that can see for hundreds of miles.

=== Badroulbadour ===
Princess Badroulbadour (Arabic: الأميرة بدر البدور) is the only daughter of the Emperor of China in the folktale, Aladdin, and whom Aladdin falls in love with after seeing her in the city with a crowd of her attendants. Aladdin uses the genie of the lamp to foil the Princess's arranged marriage to the Grand Vizier's son, and marries her himself. The Princess is described as being somewhat spoiled and vain. Her name is often changed in many retellings to make it easier to pronounce.

=== The Barber of Baghdad ===
The Barber of Baghdad (Arabic: المزين البغدادي) is wrongly accused of smuggling and in order to save his life, he tells Caliph Mustensir Billah of his six brothers in order:

- Al-Bakbuk, who was a hunchback
- Al-Haddar (also known as Alnaschar), who was paralytic
- Al-Fakik, who was blind
- Al-Kuz, who lost one of his eyes
- Al-Nashshár, who was “cropped of both ears”
- Shakashik, who had a harelip

=== Cassim ===
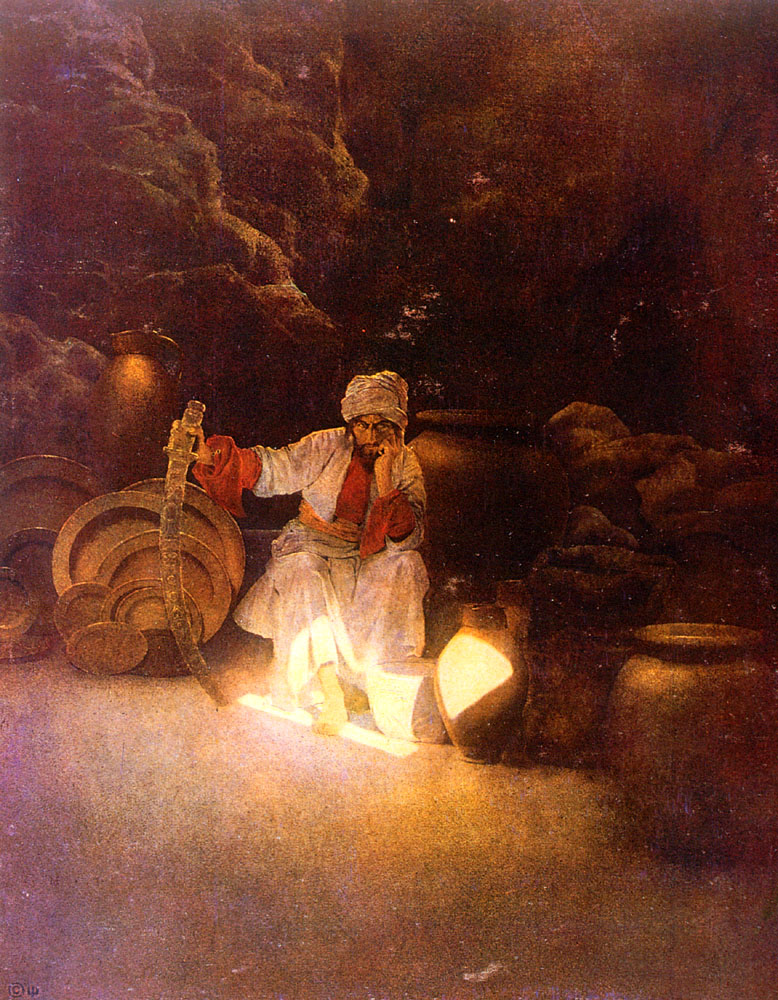
Cassim, Ali Baba's elder brother, as depicted by Maxfield Parrish (1909)

Cassim (Arabic: قاسم, qāsim, 'divider, distributor') is the rich and greedy brother of Ali Baba who is killed by the Forty Thieves when he is caught stealing treasure from their magic cave.

=== Duban ===
Duban or Douban (Arabic: ذُؤْبَان, ḏuʾbān, 'golden jackal' or 'wolves'), who appears in The Tale of the Vizier and the Sage Duban, is a man of extraordinary talent with the ability to read Arabic, Greek, Persian, Turkish, Byzantine, Syriac, Hebrew, and Sanskrit, as well as a deep understanding of botany, philosophy, and natural history to name a few.

Duban works his medicine in an unusual way: he creates a mallet and ball to match, filling the handle of the mallet with his medicine. With this, he cures King Yunan of leprosy; when the king plays with the ball and mallet, he perspires, thus absorbing the medicine through the sweat from his hand into his bloodstream. After a short bath and a sleep, the King is cured, and rewards Duban with wealth and royal honor.

The King's vizier, however, becomes jealous of Duban, and persuades Yunan into believing that Duban will later produce a medicine to kill him. The king eventually decides to punish Duban for his alleged treachery, and summons him to be beheaded. After unsuccessfully pleading for his life, Duban offers one of his prized books to Yunan to impart the rest of his wisdom. Yunan agrees, and the next day, Duban is beheaded, and Yunan begins to open the book, finding that no printing exists on the paper. After paging through for a time, separating the stuck leaves each time by first wetting his finger in his mouth, he begins to feel ill. Yunan realises that the leaves of the book were poisoned, and as he dies, the king understands that this was his punishment for betraying the one that once saved his life.

=== Hussain ===
Prince Hussain (Arabic: الأمير حسين), the eldest son of the Sultan of the Indies, travels to Bisnagar (Vijayanagara) in India and buys a magic teleporting tapestry, also known as a magic carpet.

=== Maruf the Cobbler ===
Maruf (Arabic: معروف, maʿrūf, 'known, recognized') is a diligent and hardworking cobbler in the city of Cairo.

In the story, he is married to a mendacious and pestering woman named Fatimah. Due to the ensuing quarrel between him and his wife, Maruf flees Cairo and enters the ancient ruins of Adiliyah. There, he takes refuge from the winter rains. After sunset, he meets a very powerful Jinni, who then transports Maruf to a distant land known as Ikhtiyan al-Khatan.

=== Morgiana ===
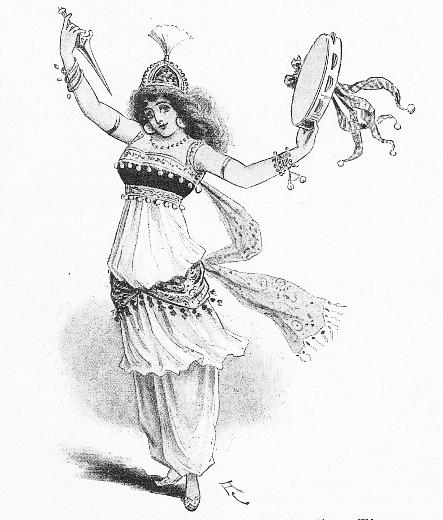
Morgiana and the Daf

Morgiana (Arabic: مرجانة, marjāna or murjāna, 'small pearl') is a clever slave girl in Ali Baba and the Forty Thieves.

She is initially in Cassim's household but on his death she joins his brother, Ali Baba, and through her quick-wittedness she saves Ali's life many times, eventually killing his worst enemy, the leader of the Forty Thieves. Afterward, Ali Baba marries his son with her.

=== Sinbad the Porter and Sinbad the Sailor ===
Sinbad the Porter (Arabic: السندباد الحمال) is a poor man who one day pauses to rest on a bench outside the gate of a rich merchant's house in Baghdad. The owner of the house is Sinbad the Sailor, who hears the porter's lament and sends for him. Amused by the fact that they share a name, Sinbad the Sailor relates the tales of his seven wondrous voyages to his namesake.

Sinbad the Sailor (Arabic: السندباد البحري; or As-Sindibād) is perhaps one of the most famous characters in the Arabian Nights. He is from Basra, but in his old age, he lives in Baghdad. He recounts the tales of his seven voyages to Sinbad the Porter.

Sinbad (Persian: سنباد, sambâd) is sometimes spelled as Sindbad, from the Arabic sindibād (سِنْدِبَاد).

=== Sultan of the Indies ===
The Sultan of the Indies (Arabic: سلطان جزر الهند) has three sons—Hussain, Ali and Ahmed—who all seek to marry their cousin Princess Nouronnihar (Arabic: الأميرة نور النهار). The Sultan declares that he will grant her hand in marriage to whichever prince that retrieves the most extraordinary and rare object.

=== Yunan ===
King Yunan (Arabic: الملك يونان, al-malik Yunān, lit. 'Yunanistan [Greece]'), or King Greece, is a fictional king of one of the ancient Persian cities in the province of Zuman, who appears in The Tale of the Vizier and the Sage Duban.

Suffering from leprosy at the beginning of the story, Yunan is cured by Duban, the physician whom he rewards greatly. Jealous of Duban's praises, Yunan's vizier becomes jealous and persuades the King that Duban wants to overthrow him. At first, Yunan does not believe this and tells his vizier the Tale of the Husband and the Parrot, to which the vizier responds by telling the Tale of the Prince and the Ogress. This convinces Yunan that Duban is guilty, having him executed. Yunan later dies after reading a book of Duban's, the pages of which had been poisoned.

=== Zayn Al-Asnam ===
Prince Zayn Al-Asnam or Zeyn Alasnam (Arabic: زين الأصنام, zayn al-aṣnām), son of the Sultan of Basra (or Bassorah), is the eponymous character in The Tale of Zayn Al-Asnam.

After his father's death, al-Asnam wastes his inheritance and neglects his duties, until the people revolt and he narrowly escapes death. In a dream, a sheikh tells the Prince to go to Egypt. A second dream tells him to go home, directing him to a hidden chamber in the palace, where he finds 8 statues made of gold (or diamond). He also finds a key and a message telling him to visit Mubarak, a slave in Cairo. Mubarak takes the Prince to a paradise island, where he meets the King of the Jinns.

The King gives Zayn a mirror, called the touchstone of virtue, which, when Zayn looks into it, will inform the prince whether a damsel is pure/faithful or not. If the mirror remains unsullied, so will prove the maiden; if, on the other hand, it should cloud over, the maiden will have been unfaithful. The King tells Zayn that he will give him the 9th statue that he is looking for in return for a beautiful 15-year-old virgin. Zayn finds the daughter of the vizier of Baghdad, but marries her himself, making her no longer a virgin. The King, however, forgives Zayn's broken promise, as the young lady herself is revealed to be the ninth statue promised to Zayn by the King. The jinn bestows the Prince with the young bride on the sole condition that Zayn remains loving and faithful to her and her only.

The Prince's name comes from Arabic zayn (زين), meaning 'beautiful, pretty', and aṣnām (أصنام), meaning 'idols'.

=== Zumurrud ===
Zumurrud the Smaragdine (Persian: زمرد سمرقندی, Zumurrud-i Samarqandi, 'emerald of Samarkand') is a slave girl who appears in Ali Shar and Zumurrud. She is named after Samarkand, the city well known at the time of the story for its emeralds.

She is bought by, and falls in love with, Ali Shar with whom she lives until she is kidnapped by a Christian. Zumurrud escapes from the Christian only to be found and taken by Javan (Juvenile) the Kurd. Again, Zumurrud manages to get away from her captor, this time by dressing up as a man. On her way back to Ali Shar, Zumurrud is mistaken for a noble Turk and made Queen of an entire kingdom. Eventually, Zumurrud is reunited with Ali Shar.

== Real people ==
Person	Description	Appears in
Abu al-Aswad al-Du'ali (Arabic: أبو الأسود الدؤلي)	an Arab linguist, a companion of Ali bin Abu Talib, and the father of Arabic grammar.	Abu al-Aswad and His Slave-girl
Abu Nuwas (Arabic: أبو نواس)	a renowned, hedonistic poet at the court of Harun al-Rashid, the Caliph.	several tales
Abu Yusuf (Arabic: أبو يوسف)	a famous legal scholar and judge, during the reign of Harun al-Rashid. Abu Yusuf was also one of the founders of the Hanafi school of Islamic law.	Abu Yusuf with Harun al-Rashid and Queen Zubayda; Harun al-Rashid and the Slave-girl and the Imam Abu Yusuf
Abd al-Malik ibn Marwan (Arabic: عبد الملك ابن مروان)	the most celebrated Umayyad caliph, ruling from A.D. 685 to 705, and a frequent character in The Nights	Alî and Zâhir from Damascus; City of Brass; Hind bint al-Nu‘mân and al-Hajjaj; The Two Dancers; Ni‘ma and Nu‘m
Adi ibn Zayd (Arabic: عدي بن زيد)	a 6th-century Arab Christian poet from al-Hirah	‘Adî ibn Zayd and the Princess Hind
Al-Amin (Arabic: الأمين)	the sixth Abbasid caliph. He succeeded his father, Harun al-Rashid, in 809, ruling until he was deposed and killed in 813, during the civil war with his half-brother, al-Ma'mun.	Al-Amin ibn al-Rashid and His Uncle Ibrahim ibn al-Mahdi; Muhammad al-Amin and the slave-girl
Al-Asmaʿi (Arabic: الأصمعي)	a celebrated Arabic grammarian and a scholar of poetry at the court of the Hārūn al-Rashīd.	Al-Asma‘î and the Girls of Basra (in which Al-Asmaʿi tells a story about himself, during the 216th night)
Al-Hadi (Arabic: الهادي)	the fourth Abbasid caliph, who succeeded his father, Al-Mahdi, and ruled from 785 until his death, in 786 AD.	Harûn al-Rashid and the Barmakids; The Tale of the Slave of Destiny
Al-Hakim bi-Amr Allah (Arabic: الحاكم بأمر الله)	the sixth Fatimid caliph and 16th Ismaili imam (996–1021).	The Caliph Al-Hâkim and the Merchant
Al-Ma'mun (Arabic: المأمون)	the seventh Abbasid caliph, reigning from 813 until his death, in 833. He succeeded his half-brother, al-Amin, after a civil war. Al-Ma'mun is one of the most frequently mentioned characters in the nights.	The Story of Al-Ma’mun and the Kilabite Girl; The Story of Al-Ma’mun and the Parasite; The Caliph Al-Ma’mun and the Pyramids of Egypt; The Caliph Al-Ma’mun and the Strange Scholar; Al-Ma’mun and Zubayda; Abu Hassan al-Ziyadî and the Khorasan Man; The Loves of Al-Hayfa’ and Yusuf; Ibrahim ibn al-Mahdi and the Barber-surgeon; The Story of the Kiss
Al-Mahdi (Arabic: المهدي)	the third Abbasid caliph, reigning from 775 to his death, in 785. He succeeded his father, al-Mansur.	Ma‘n obtains Pardon for a Rebel; The Tale of the Slave of Destiny
Al-Mu'tadid (Arabic: المعتضد بالله)	the Abbasid caliph from 892 until his death, in 902	Abu ’l-Hasan of Khorasan; The Tale of the Warlock and the Young Cook of Baghdad
Al-Mutawakkil (Arabic: المتوكل على الله)	an Abbasid caliph who reigned in Samarra, from 847 until 861.	Al-Fath ibn Khâqân and the Caliph al-Mutawakkil; Al-Mutawakkil and His Concubine Mahbûba
Mustensir Billah (or Al-Mustansir) (Arabic: المستنصر بالله)	the Abbasid caliph in Baghdad, from 1226 to 1242.	(The Barber of Baghdad tells Mustensir stories of his six brothers)
Al-Mustazi (aka Az-Zahir)	the Abbasid caliph in Baghdad, from 1225 to 1226.	The Hunchback’s Tale
Al-Walid I	an Umayyad caliph, ruling from 705 until his assassination, in the year 715.	The city of Lablayt
Al-Walid II (Arabic: الوليد بن يزيد)	an Umayyad caliph, ruling from 743 until his assassination, in the year 744.	Yûnus the Scribe and Walîd ibn Sahl (appears spuriously)
Baibars (Arabic: الملك الظاهر ركن الدين بيبرس)	the fourth Mamluk sultan of Egypt and the real founder of the Bahri dynasty. He was one of the commanders of the Egyptian forces that inflicted a defeat on the Seventh Crusade. He also led the vanguard of the Egyptian army at the Battle of Ain Jalut, in 1260. In The Nights, Baibars is the main protagonist of The Adventures of Sultan Baybars, a romance focusing on his life; he also features as a main character in Al-Malik al-Zahir Rukn al-Din Baybars al-Bunduqdari and the Sixteen Captains of Police, the frame story of one cycle.	The Adventures of Sultan Baybars; Al-Malik al-Zahir Rukn al-Din Baybars al-Bunduqdari and the Sixteen Captains of Police
David IV of Georgia (appears as 'Sword of the Messiah')	Portrayed as having a cross carved onto his face. Sharkan kills him in this story, weakening the Christian army.	story of Sharkan
Harun al-Rashid (Arabic: هارون الرشيد)	fifth Abbasid caliph, ruling from 786 until 809. The wise caliph serves as an important character in many of the stories set in Baghdad, frequently in connection with his vizier, Ja'far, with whom he roams in disguise through the streets of the city, to observe the lives of the ordinary people.	several tales
Hisham ibn Abd al-Malik (Arabic: هشام ابن عبد الملك)	the 10th Umayyad caliph, ruling from 724 until 743.	Hishâm and the Arab Youth; Yûnus the Scribe and Walîd ibn Sahl
Ibrahim al-Mawsili (Arabic: إبراهيم الموصلي)	a Persian singer and Arabic-language poet, appearing in several stories	The Lovers of al-Madina; Abdallah ibn Fadil and His Brothers; Ibrahim of Mosul and the Devil
Ibrahim ibn al-Mahdi (Arabic: إبراهيم بن المهدي)	an Abbasid prince, singer, composer and poet, featuring in several tales.	Al-Amîn ibn al-Rashîd and His Uncle Ibrâhîm ibn al-Mahdî; Ibrâhîm ibn al-Mahdî and the Barber-surgeon; Ibrâhîm ibn al-Mahdî and the Merchant’s Sister
Ishaq al-Mawsili (Arabic: إسحاق الموصلي)	a Persian musician and a boon companion in the Abbasid court, at the time of Harun al-Rashid. Ishaq appears in several tales.	Ishaq of Mosul and the Lost Melody; Ishaq of Mosul and the Merchant; Ishaq of Mosul and His Mistress and the Devil; The Story of Ishaq and the Roses
Ja'far ibn Yahya (Arabic: جعفر البرمكي) (aka Ja'far or Ja'afar the Barmecide)	Harun al-Rashid's Persian vizier who appears in many stories, normally accompanying Harun. In at least one of these stories, The Three Apples, Ja'far is the protagonist, depicted in a role similar to a detective. In another story, The Tale of Attaf, he is also a protagonist, depicted as an adventurer alongside the protagonist, Attaf.	The Three Apples; The Tale of Attaf
Khusrau Parviz (New Persian: خسرو پرویز; Arabic: كسرى الثاني) (aka Khosrow II, Kisra the Second)	the king of Persia, from 590 to 628. He appears in a story with his wife, Shirin, on the 391st night.	Khusrau and Shirin and the Fisherman (391st night)
Ma'n ibn Za'ida (Arabic: معن بن زائدة)	An 8th-century Arab general of the Shayban tribe, who served both the Umayyads and the Abbasids. He acquired a legendary reputation as a fierce warrior and, also, for his extreme generosity. Ma'n appears as a main character in four tales, in The Arabian Nights.	Tale of Ma‘n ibn Zâ’ida; It is Impossible to Arouse Ma‘n’s Anger; Ma‘n Obtains Pardon for a Rebel; Ma‘n ibn Zâ’ida and the Badawî
Moses	The Biblical and Islamic prophet appears in one story, recited on the 82nd night, by one of the girls trained by Dahat al-Dawahi, in order to infiltrate the Sultan's court. In the story, Moses helps the daughter of Shu'aib fill her jar of water. Shu'aib tells them to fetch Moses to thank him, but Moses must avert his eyes from the woman's exposed buttocks, showing his mastery of his sexual urges.	story on the 82nd night
Muawiyah I (Arabic: معاوية بن أبي سفيان)	the founder and first caliph of the Umayyad Caliphate.	Qamar al-Zamân and Budûr; The Badawî and His Wife
Roderic (not named directly)	the Visigothic king is referenced in a story recited on the 272nd and 273rd nights. In the story, he opens a mysterious door of his castle that was locked and sealed shut by the previous kings. He discovers paintings of Muslim soldiers in the room and a note, saying that the city of Lablayt will fall to the soldiers in the paintings if the room is ever opened. This fits the fall of Toledo in 711.	The city of Lablayt
Shirin (Persian: شيرين, Šīrīn)	the wife of Khosrow II (Khusrau), the Sassanid king, with whom she appears in a story on the 391st night.	Khusrau and Shirin and the Fisherman (391st night)
Sulayman ibn Abd al-Malik (Arabic: سليمان ابن عبد الملك)	the seventh Umayyad caliph, ruling from 715 until 717.	Khuzaymaibn Bishr and ‘Ikrima al-Fayyâd
Tariq ibn Ziyad	Umayyad commander who initiated the Muslim conquest of Visigothic Hispania.	The city of Lablayt

== See also ==
- List of stories within One Thousand and One Nights
