= Ahmed and Paribanou =

Arab folk tale translated to French

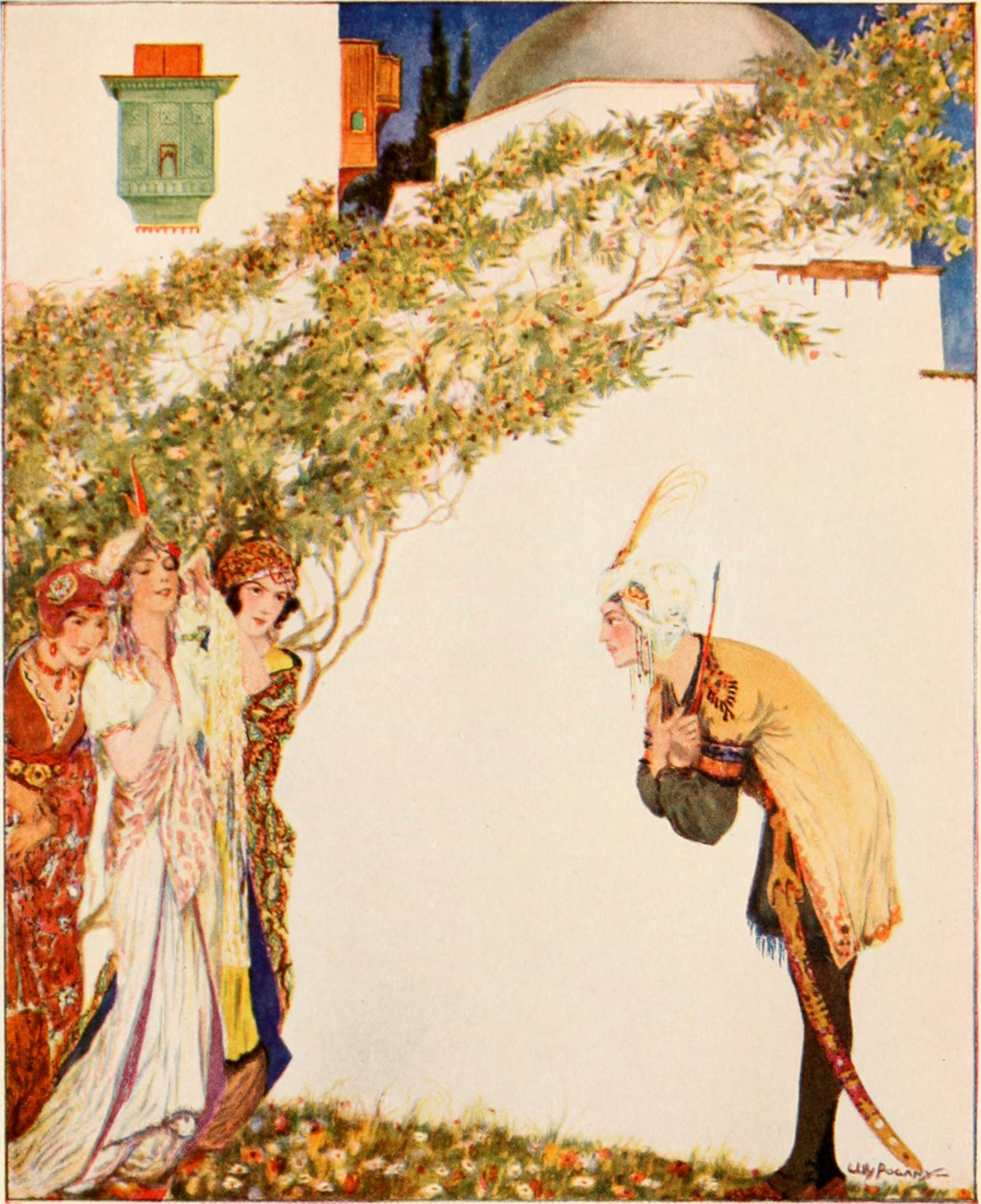
Illustration by Willy Pogany, 1915

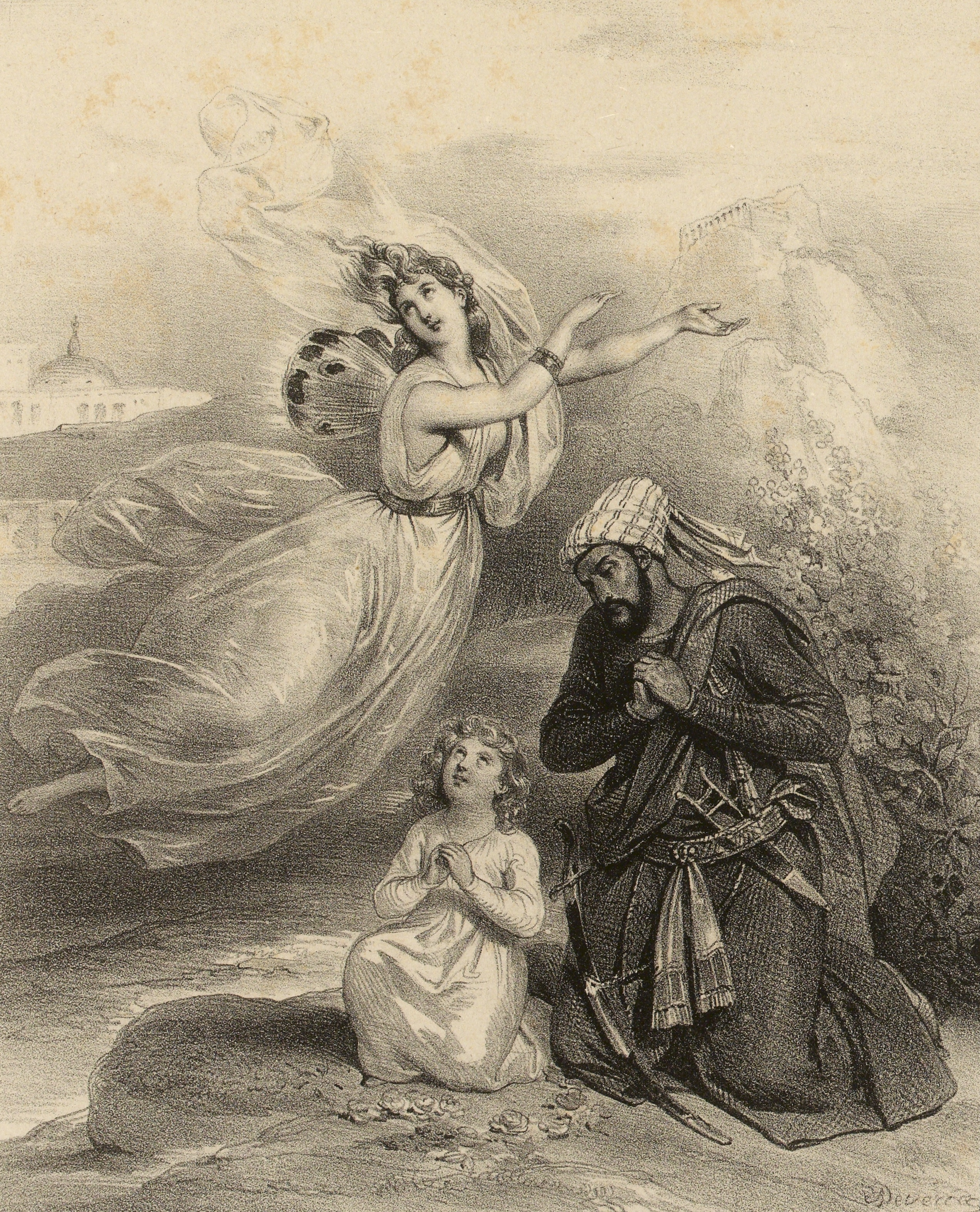
Lithograph by Achille Devéria, 1833

Ahmed and Paribanou, or The Story of Prince Ahmed and the fairy Pari Banou, is one of the tales of the Arabian Nights compilation.

== Summary ==
One of the Islamic kings of India had three sons, namely Houssain (Husayn), Ali, and Ahmed (Ahmad), and a niece named Nouronnihar (Nur al-Nahar). Prince Ahmed was the youngest brother after Houssain and Ali. The three brothers, each in love with Princess Nouronnihar were sent away for a year to find an object for the Sultan to win her hand. The oldest, Ali found a magic carpet of wondrous locomotive powers. Houssain found an ivory tusk that had the power to find anyone as they are. Ahmed was equally blessed in the ownership of a magic apple, that had the power to heal anyone of any sickness. On return to their kingdom, their father found each of their objects equally special and proposed an archery contest to determine the winner. Ahmed overshot his arrow and lost it, leading to his eldest brother (Ali) marrying Nouronnihar. Broken hearted, Ahmed went on a journey to find his lost arrow where he found the fairy Paribanou (Peri Banu), whom he quickly wedded upon her request. Their post-wedding festivities lasted six months and Ahmed found himself missing his father. The Sultan found himself suspicious of his son's whereabouts when he was not in their court and sent a sorceress to investigate. After learning of Ahmed's marriage to the fairy Paribanu, he tested them both by giving them impossible tasks, including a tent that cover a whole army when spread. The fairytale ends with Ahmed being proclaimed Sultan.

== Analysis ==
=== Tale type ===
The tale is a combination of two tale types listed in the international Aarne-Thompson-Uther Index: ATU 653A: "The Rarest Thing in the World", and ATU 465: "The Man Persecuted because of His Beautiful Wife".

=== Origins ===
The tale is also considered to be one of the so-called "orphan stories" of the Arabian Nights compilation, because a Persian or Indian original text has not been found, unlike other tales. Some scholars, including Ulrich Marzolph and Ruth Bottigheimer, ascribe its source to a Maronite Christian named Hanna Diyab, from whom French author Antoine Galland collected the story.

== Legacy ==
According to Ulrich Marzolph, tales collected later from oral tradition derive from Galland's translation of this story in The Arabian Nights.

The story was adapted by German film director Lotte Reiniger as the film The Adventures of Prince Achmed (1926).

== See also ==
- Peri
- Genie
- Islam and magic
- Muslim period in the Indian subcontinent
- Persian carpet

== Sources ==
- Marzolph, Ulrich; Van Leeuwen, Richard (2004). "Ahmad and the Fairy Perî Bânû, 355 Prince (Burton referring to Galland's adaptation)". The Arabian Nights Encyclopedia. Santa Barbara, CA: ABC Clio. pp. 81–2.
- Walsh, William Shepard (1915). "Ahmed, Prince". Heroes and Heroines of Fiction. Philadelphia, PA: J. B. Lippincott Company. p. 11.
