= List of geological features on Enceladus =

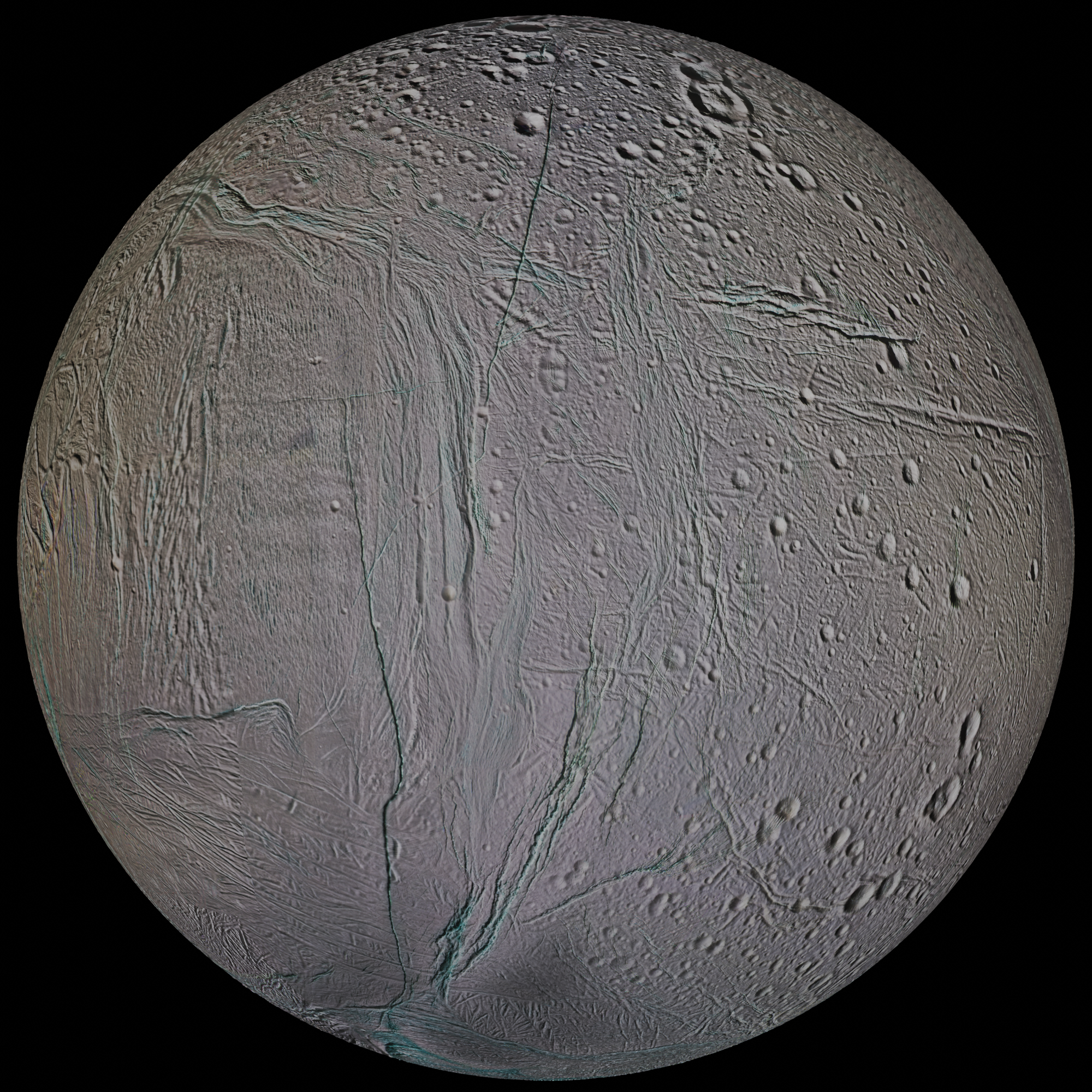
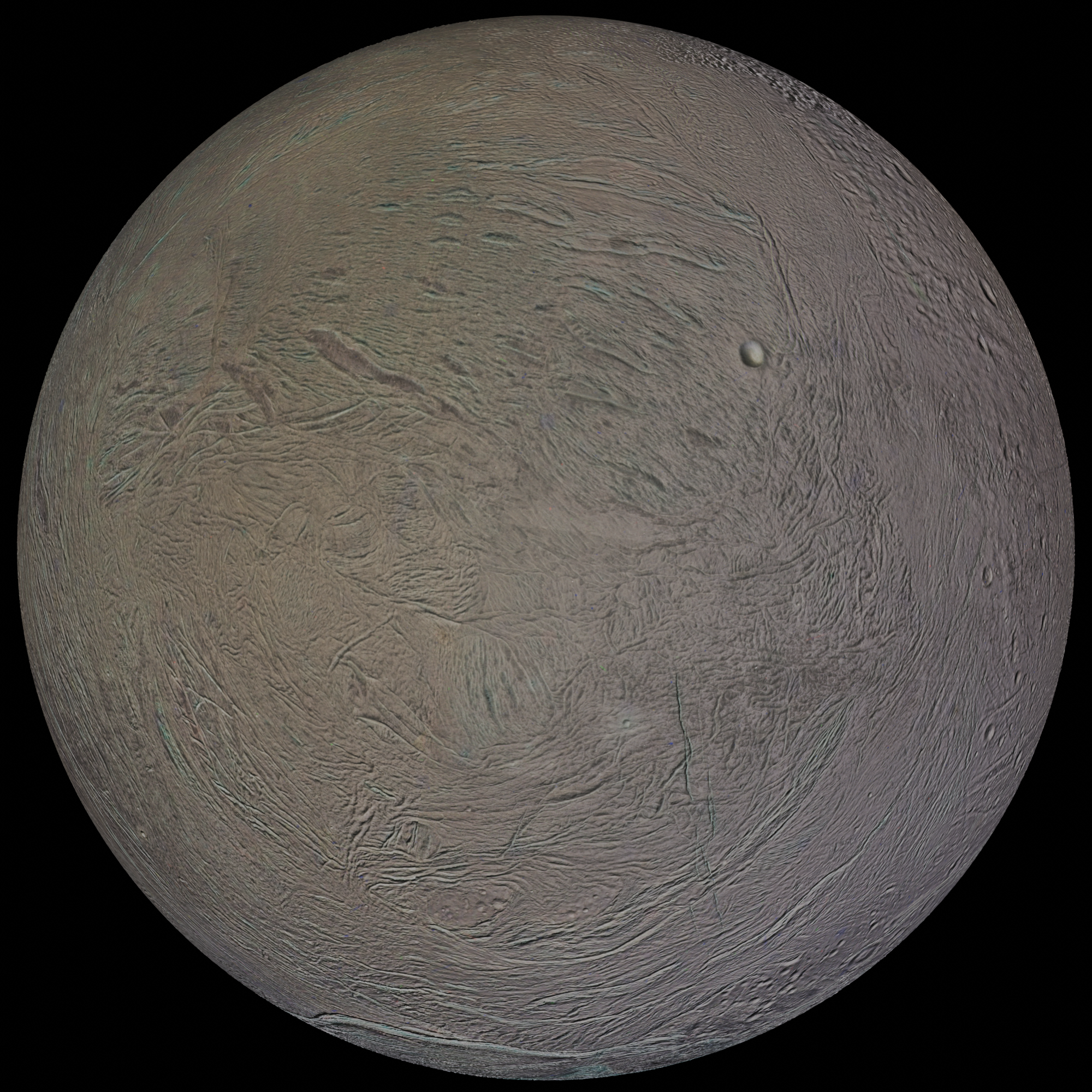

This is a list of named geological features on Enceladus. Geological features on Enceladus are named after people and places from Burton's translation of The Book of the Thousand Nights and a Night, also known as (The Tales of the) Arabian Nights.

== Planitiae ==
Enceladean plains are called planitiae. They are named after the locations of events in the Arabian Nights.

Planitia	Named after
Diyar Planitia	Diyar
Sarandib Planitia	Serendib

== Dorsa ==
Enceladean ridges are called dorsa. They are named after the locations of events in the Arabian Nights.

Dorsa	Named after	Location	Notes
Cufa Dorsa	Cufa, the eponymous city in the Tale of Kamar Al-Zaman.	3°11′N 286°10′W	On the trailing hemisphere, it was formed through thrust faulting and compressional forces. It is 90 kilometres (56 mi) in diameter, and its name was officially approved by the International Astronomical Union on 7 November 2006.
Ebony Dorsum	Ebony, a city in the Tale of Kamar Al-Zaman	5°44′N 280°32′W	70 kilometres (43 mi) in diameter. Its name was officially approved by the International Astronomical Union on 7 November 2006.

== Sulci ==
Sulci are long, parallel grooves. Enceladean sulci are named after the locations of events in the Arabian Nights.

Sulcus	Named after
Alexandria Sulcus	Alexandria, Egypt
Al-Medinah Sulci	Medina, Saudi Arabia
Al-Yaman Sulci	Yemen
Andalús Sulci	Al-Andalus
Baghdad Sulcus	Baghdad, Iraq
Bulak Sulcus	Boulaq, Egypt
Cairo Sulcus	Cairo, Egypt
Camphor Sulcus	Camphor
Cashmere Sulci	Kashmir
Damascus Sulcus	Damascus, Syria
Hamah Sulci	Hama, Syria
Harran Sulci	Harran, Turkey
Labtayt Sulci	Labtayt, possibly Leptis Magna
Láhej Sulci	Lahij, Yemen
Makran Sulci	Makran, Pakistan
Misr Sulci	Egypt
Mosul Sulci	Mosul, Iraq
Samarkand Sulci	Samarkand, Uzbekistan
Shiraz Sulcus	Shiraz, Iran
Sind Sulci	Sindh, Pakistan

== Fossae ==
Fossae are ditches or trenches. Enceladean fossae are named after the locations of events in the Arabian Nights.

Fossa	Named after
Anbar Fossae	Anbar, Iraq
Bassorah Fossa	Basra, Iraq
Bishangarh Fossae	Bishangarh
Daryabar Fossa	Daryabar
Isbanir Fossa	Isbanir
Kaukabán Fossae	Kaukaban, Yemen
Khorasan Fossa	Khorasan

== Rupes ==
On Enceladus, escarpments are called rupes.

Rupes	Named after
Samaria Rupes	Samaria, from Khudadad and His Brothers

== Craters ==
Enceladean craters are named after characters in the Arabian Nights.

Crater	Named after
Ahmad	Ahmad
Ajib	Brother of Gharib in "The History of Gharib and His Brother Ajib."
Al-Bakbuk	Al-Bakbuk
Al-Fakik	Al-Fakik
Al-Haddar	Al-Haddar
Al-Kuz	Al-Kuz
Al-Mustazi	Al-Mustazi
Aladdin	Aladdin
Ali Baba	Ali Baba
Ayyub	Ayyub
Aziz	Aziz
Bahman	Oldest prince in "The Two Sisters Who Envied Their Cadette"
Behram	Bahram, likely influenced by Bahram V
Dalilah	Dalilah
Duban	Duban
Dunyazad	Dunyazad
Fitnah	Fitnah
Ghanim	Ghanim
Gharib	Gharib in "The History of Gharib and His Brother Ajib."
Harun	Harun al-Rashid
Hassan	Hassan
Hisham	Caliph in "The Caliph Hisham and the Arab Youth"
Ishak	Character in "Isaac of Mosul and the Merchant"
Jaʽafar	Jaʻfar ibn Yahya
Jansha	Janshah
Julnar	Julnar the Sea-Born and Her Son King Badr Basim of Persia
Kamar	Kamar al-Akmár in "The Ebony Horse"
Kasim	Brother of Ali Baba
Khusrau	Sassanid ruler Khosrau II
Maʽaruf	Hero of "Maʽaruf the Cobbler and His Wife Fatimah"
Marjanah	Marjanah
Masrur	Eunuch in "Nur al-Din Ali and the Damsel Anis al-Jalis"
Morgiana	Slave girl in "Ali Baba and the Forty Thieves"
Musa	Musa
Mustafa	Mustafa in Aladdin
Omar	Omar
Otbah	Otbah and Rayya
Parwez	Second prince in "The Two Sisters Who Envied Their Cadette"
Peri-Banu	Peri-Banu
Perizadah	Youngest princess in "The Two Sisters Who Envied Their Cadette"
Rayya	Otbah and Rayya
Sabur	King of Persia in "The Ebony Horse", likely influenced by Shapur II
Salih	Salih
Samad	Samad
Shahrazad	Shahrazad
Shahryar	Shahryar
Shakashik	Shakashik
Sharrkan	Sharrkan
Shirin	Shirin
Sindbad	Sindbad
Yunan	King of Persian city in "The Tale of the Vizier and the Sage Duban"
Zaynab	Daughter of Dalilah in "The Rogueries of Dalilah the Crafty and Her Daughter Zaynab the Coney-Catcher"
Zumurrud	Zumurrud

== See also ==
- List of quadrangles on Enceladus
