= Sharrkan (crater) =

Crater on Enceladus

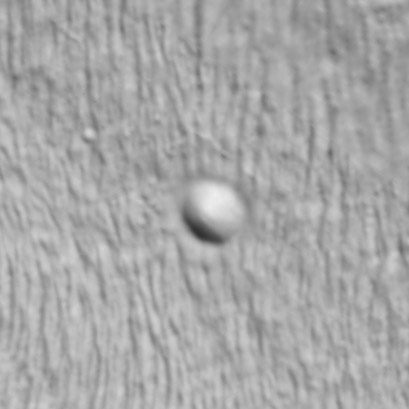
- Sharrkan (center) as seen by the Cassini spacecraft on February 17, 2005
- Location: 16.07°N 302.21°W
- Diameter: 3.6 km
- Discoverer: Cassini
- Naming: Sharrkan; Son of King Omar

Sharrkan is an impact crater in the northern hemisphere of Saturn's moon Enceladus. Sharrkan was first observed in Cassini images during that mission's February 2005 flyby of Enceladus. It is located at 16.4° North Latitude, 298.3° West Longitude. At only 3.6 kilometers across, Sharrkan is the smallest named crater on Enceladus, though numerous, smaller, unnamed craters have been observed. The crater has a basic bowl-shape typical of small, simple craters.

Sharrkan is named after one of the sons of King Omar in "The Tale of King Omar and his Sons" in The Book of One Thousand and One Nights.

== See also ==
- Al-Kuz
- Otbah (crater)
- Shirin (crater)
