= Ali Baba (crater) =

Crater on Enceladus

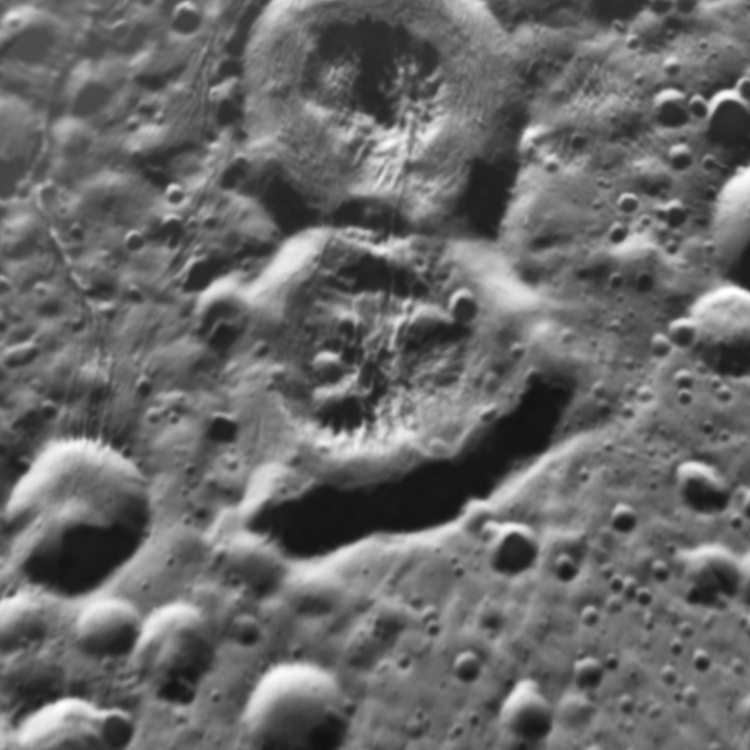
- Ali Baba crater (center)
- Location: 55.11°N 22.34°W
- Diameter: 39.2 km
- Discoverer: Voyager 2
- Naming: Ali Baba

Ali Baba is a large crater in the northern hemisphere of Saturn's moon Enceladus. Ali Baba was first discovered in Voyager 2 images. It is located at 55.1° North Latitude, 22.3° West Longitude and is 39.2 kilometers across. It is located near the craters Aladdin and Samad. Ali Baba has a large dome in its interior, suggesting the crater has undergone viscous relaxation. The top of the dome even reaches higher than the crater rim.

This crater is named after Ali Baba, the hero from the tale "Ali Baba and the Forty Thieves" in Sir Richard Burton's translation of The Book of One Thousand and One Nights.

The largest craters on Enceladus include:
Crater	Diameter (km)	Coordinates
Ali Baba	39.2	55.11°N 22.34°W
Aladdin	37.4	60.69°N 26.66°W
Dunyazad	30.9	41.9°N 200.6°W
Sindbad	29.1	67°N 212.07°W
Gharib	26	81.12°N 241.15°W
