= Rayya =

Rayya may refer to:

- Rayya. a character in the tale "Otbah and Rayya" in One Thousand and One Nights
- Rayya (Punjab), a town and nagar panchayat in Amritsar district
- Rayya (crater), named after the character from One Thousand and One Nights
