= Spoils of War =

Spoils of War or The Spoils of War may refer to:

== Warfare concepts ==
- Prize of war, regarded as legitimate
- War looting, regarded as illegitimate
  - Wartime sexual violence by extension
- The Spoils of War (symposium), a 1995 symposium on art plundered as a result of World War II

== Film and television ==
- Spoils of War (film), a 2000 Argentinian documentary
- The Spoils of War (TV serial), a 1980–1981 British series
- "The Spoils of War" (Game of Thrones), a 2017 episode
- "Spoils of War" (Men Behaving Badly), a 1997 episode of the American series
- "Spoils of War" (Sea Patrol), a 2011 episode
- "Spoils of War" (Star Wars: The Bad Batch), a 2023 episode
- "Spoils of War" (Stargate Atlantis), a 2008 episode

== Other media ==
- Spoils of War, a 1988 play by Michael Weller
- The Spoils of War, a 2006 Alan Craik novel by Gordon Kent (Christian Cameron)
- The Spoils of War, The Damned Trilogy, Alan Dean Foster

== Other uses ==
- Al-Anfal (Arabic for "The Spoils of War"), the eighth chapter of the Qur'an
- Ghanima (disambiguation) (Arabic for "The Spoils of War")
