= Otbah =

Otbah may refer to:

- Otbah, from the tale Otbah and Rayya from The Book of One Thousand and One Nights
- Otbah, character from Chu Chin Chow, based on Arabian Nights
- Otbah (crater), named after the character from The Book of One Thousand and One Nights
