= Ghanim =

Ghanim is a surname. Notable people with the surname include:

- Antoine Ghanim, Lebanese politician and an MP in the Lebanese Parliament
- Ghanim Abdulrahman al-Harbi, Saudi detainee at Guantanamo Bay
- Ghanim Al-Jumaily (born 1950), the ambassador of Iraq to Saudi Arabia
- Ghanim Bin Saad Al Saad (born 1964), Arab businessman
- Ghanim Oraibi (born 1961), Iraqi football defender
- Ibrahim Al-Ghanim (born 1983), Qatari footballer
- Khalil Ghanim (born 1964), footballer from UAE
- Marzouq Al-Ghanim, member and the current speaker of the Kuwaiti National Assembly
- Mohammed Ghanim, former Qatari football player
- Mohammed Rajab Sadiq Abu Ghanim, Yemeni detainee at Guantanamo Bay
- Mubarak Ghanim, (born 1963), footballer from UAE
- Nassir Al-Ghanim (born 1961), Kuwaiti football midfielder
- Nasser Ghanim Al Khulaifi (born 1973), Qatari sports businessman, former professional tennis player
- Shukri Ghanim (1942–2012), Libyan politician, General Secretary of the General People's Committee of Libya (2003–2006)
- Wahib al-Ghanim (1919–2003), Syrian physician who confounded the Ba'ath Party

== See also ==
- Bab al-Ghawanima (Gate of Bani Ghanim), the NW gate of Al-Aqsa compound, Jerusalem
- Ghanim (crater), impact crater in the northern hemisphere of Saturn's moon Enceladus
- Al Ghanim, settlement in Qatar, located in the municipality of Ad Dawhah
- GSSG - Ghanim Bin Saad Al Saad & Sons Group (GSSG), the largest private sector company headquartered at Doha, Qatar
- Ganim
- Ghanima (disambiguation)
