= Bassorah Fossa =

Trough on Enceladus

Bassorah Fossa is a trough south of Ali Baba crater on Saturn's moon Enceladus. Bassorah Fossa was first seen in Voyager 2 images. It is located at 45.4° north, 6.3° west, and is 131 kilometers long.

Bassorah Fossa is named after the city of Basra, Iraq, from which Sindbad embarked on his third voyage in the Arabian Nights.
