= Al-Haddar =

Crater on Enceladus

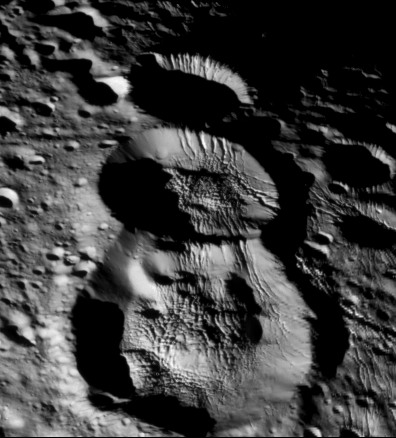
- Al-Haddar crater (top) as seen by the Cassini spacecraft on March 9, 2005
- Location: 50.54°N 200.64°W
- Diameter: 15 km
- Discoverer: Voyager 2
- Naming: Al-Haddar; The barber's second brother in "The Hunchback’s Tale"

Al-Haddar is an impact crater on Saturn's moon Enceladus, first discovered by the Voyager spacecraft. It is named after Al-Haddar, one of the barber's six brothers in "The Hunchback's Tale" from The Book of One Thousand and One Nights.

Al-Haddar is located at 50.5° North Latitude, 200.6° West Longitude and is approximately 14 kilometers across. It is the northernmost and smallest crater of a prominent crater triplet on Enceladus' anti-Saturnian hemisphere. There is no evidence that the impacts are related or were formed from the break-up of a single body, like Shoemaker-Levy 9. Voyager 2 observations of Al-Haddar revealed a bowl-shaped, simple crater, compared to its larger, more complex southern neighbors, Shahrazad and Dunyazad craters. The crater was mostly in shadow during the Cassini Spacecraft's close flyby on March 9, 2005, but numerous tectonic fractures were observed along its northern rim.
