= Shahryar (crater) =

Crater on Enceladus

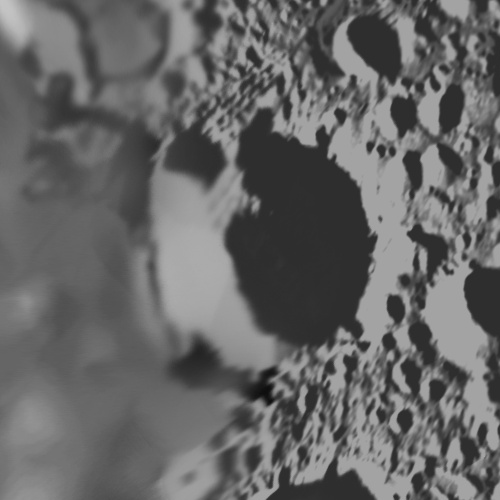
- Shahryar crater (center)
- Location: 58.32°N 227.5°W
- Diameter: 24 km (15 mi)
- Discoverer: Voyager 2
- Naming: Shahryār; Persian king

Shahryar is a crater in the northern hemisphere of Saturn's moon Enceladus. Shahryar was first seen in Voyager 2 images, but was seen at much higher resolution by the Cassini spacecraft. It is located at 58.3° North Latitude, 227.5° West Longitude and is 24 kilometres (15 mi) across. Despite being nearly the same size as the nearby Sindbad crater, Shahryar does not exhibit a dome-like structure on its floor, suggesting it has not undergone significant viscous relaxation. In addition, there is very little evidence that it has experienced tectonic deformation, suggesting that Shahryar is a relatively young crater.

Shahryār is named after the king from Arabian Nights, who is told tales by Scheherazade to dissuade him from continuing to kill women.
