= Zumurrud (crater) =

Crater on Saturn's moon Enceladus

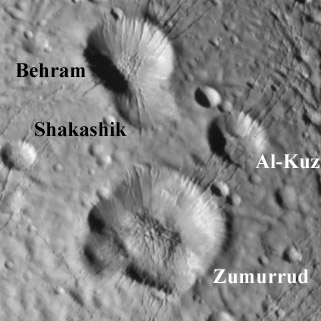
- Zumurrud (bottom center) as seen by the Cassini spacecraft on July 14, 2005
- Location: 21.9°S 181.57°W
- Diameter: 21 km
- Discoverer: Cassini
- Naming: Zumurrud

Zumurrud is a large impact crater on the anti-Saturn hemisphere of Saturn's moon Enceladus. Zumurrud was first observed in Cassini images during that mission's March 2005 flyby of Enceladus. It is located at 21.9° South Latitude, 181.6° West Longitude, and is 21 kilometers across.

Images taken by Cassini during its March and July 2005 flybys of Enceladus revealed a great deal about the geology of this impact crater. Since formation, Zumurrud has been modified by viscous relaxation (forming an updomed floor like those seen in similar-sized craters on Enceladus, like Shahrazad), tectonic fracturing along the crater's rim, forming canyons hundreds of meters deep, and subsequent cratering, like the small crater along Zumurrud's western rim. In addition, brightness variations can be seen along the eastern crater wall, suggesting variations in water ice grain size.

Zumurrud is named after the female character in the tale "Ali Shar and Zumurrud" from The Book of One Thousand and One Nights.
