= Ayyub (crater) =

Crater on Enceladus

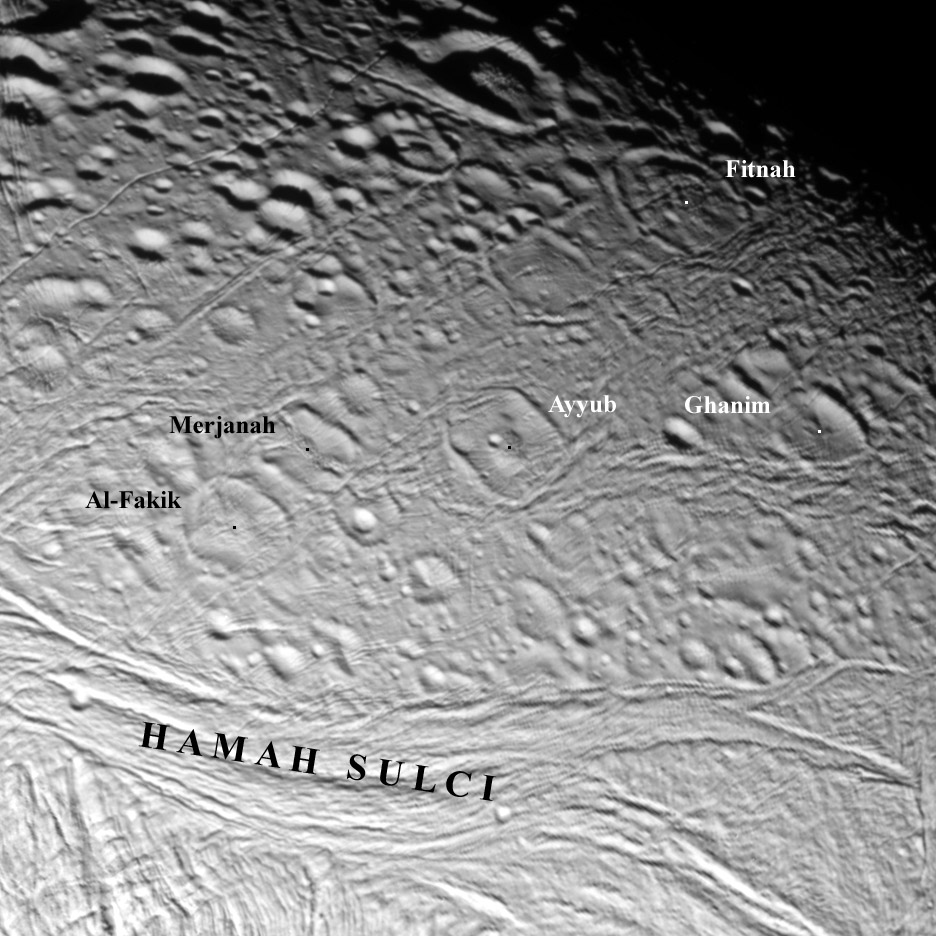
- Ayyub (center) as seen by the Cassini spacecraft on February 17, 2005
- Location: 38.44°N 295.67°W
- Diameter: 18 km
- Discoverer: Cassini
- Naming: Ayyub, a fictional character

Ayyub is an impact crater in the northern hemisphere of Saturn's moon Enceladus. Ayyub was first observed in Cassini images during that mission's February 2005 flyby of Enceladus. It is located at 38.4° North Latitude, 295.7° West Longitude and is 18 kilometers across. The topography of the impact crater appears very subdued, suggesting that the crater has undergone significant viscous relaxation since its formation. Tectonics has also affected this crater, by influencing the final, polygonal shape of the crater as well disrupting the southeastern and northwestern margins of the crater following its formation.

The crater is named after a fictional Damascus merchant from the "Tale of Ghanim bin Ayyub, the Distraught, the Thrall o’ Love" in The Book of One Thousand and One Nights. In the tale, he is father to Ghanim and Fitnah, and craters named Ghanim and Fitnah are found near the crater Ayyub.
