= Samad (crater) =

Crater on Enceladus

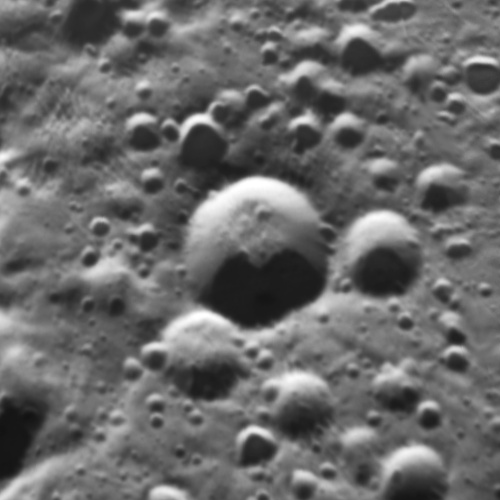
- Samad crater (center)
- Location: 60.3°N 4.48°W
- Diameter: 16.3 km
- Discoverer: Voyager 2
- Naming: Sheikh who guides Musa and Talib to the mountains in the tale "The City of Brass"

Samad is a crater in the northern hemisphere of Saturn's geologically active moon Enceladus. Samad was first discovered in Voyager 2 images. It is located at 60.3° North Latitude, 4.5° West Longitude and is 16.3 kilometres (10.1 mi) across. Currently available images are too low in resolution to determine if this crater has been tectonically deformed, but the lack of a prominent central dome suggests Samad has not undergone the level of viscous relaxation of other craters in its size range, like Dalilah or Ahmad. Samad is located near the larger craters Aladdin and Ali Baba.

Samad is named after a Sheikh who guides Musa and Talib to the mountains in the tale "The City of Brass" from One Thousand and One Nights.
