= Isbanir Fossa =

Escarpment on Enceladus

Isbanir Fossa is a north-south trending escarpment on Saturn's moon Enceladus. Isbanir Fossa was first seen in Voyager 2 images, though a small section was seen at much higher resolution by Cassini. It is centred at 12.6° North Latitude, 354.0° West Longitude and is approximately 132 kilometres long. Based on photoclinometric analysis of Voyager 2 images (using topographic shading in an image to determine slope), like the one at right, Isbanir Fossa was determined to be a 300-metre tall, west-dipping scarp (Kargel and Pozio 1996). Two sets of troughs can be seen running perpendicular to Isbanir Fossa, like Daryabar Fossa. These troughs appear to be right-laterally offset 15–20 km east and west of Isbanir Fossa, suggesting that the scarp may be a strike-slip fault or even a transform fault with troughs like Daryabar Fossa representing spreading centres (Rothery 1999).

Isbanir Fossa is named after the home of Fakir Taj from Arabian Nights.
