= Al-Bakbuk =

Crater on Enceladus

- Al-Bakbuk (center) as seen by the Cassini spacecraft on March 9, 2005
- Location: 5.65°N 191.19°W
- Diameter: 9 km
- Discoverer: Cassini
- Naming: Al-Bakbuk; The Barber's first brother

Al-Bakbuk is an impact crater in the northern hemisphere of Saturn's moon Enceladus. Al-Bakbuk was first observed in Cassini images during that mission's March 2005 flyby of Enceladus. It is located at 5.65°N 191.19°W and is 9 kilometers across. Since the crater's formation, numerous north–south trending fractures cut across the crater, forming canyons several hundred meters deep along the crater's rim.

Al-Bakbuk is named after one of the barber's six brothers in "The Hunchback's Tale" in The Book of One Thousand and One Nights.
