= Behram (crater) =

Crater on Enceladus

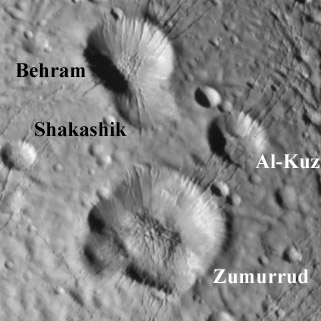
- Behram (top center) as seen by the Cassini spacecraft on July 14, 2005
- Location: 15.41°S 181.02°W
- Diameter: 13.7 km
- Discoverer: Cassini
- Naming: Behram; The fictional son of a Persian King from "Prince Behram and the Princess Al-Datma."

Behram is an impact crater on the anti-Saturn hemisphere of Saturn's moon Enceladus. Behram was first observed in Cassini images during that mission's March 2005 flyby of Enceladus. It is located at 15.4° South Latitude, 181.0° West Longitude, and is 13.7 kilometers across. Behram's rim overlaps that of Shakashik, suggesting that Behram formed after Shakashik. Following formation, numerous criss-crossing fractures cut across Behram, forming canyons hundreds of meters deep along the crater's rim, as well as a region of disrupted terrain on the crater floor. The International Astronomical Union (IAU) adopted the S. Behram designation for feature ID 14238 in 2007.
