= Al-Mustazi =

Crater on Enceladus

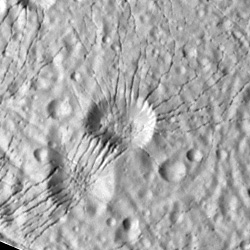
- Al-Mustazi (center) as seen by the Cassini spacecraft on July 14, 2005
- Location: 20.86°S 202.04°W
- Diameter: 10.3 km
- Discoverer: Cassini
- Naming: Az-Zahir; Abbasid Caliph

Al-Mustazi is an impact crater located on the anti-Saturn hemisphere of Saturn's moon Enceladus. Al-Mustazi was first observed in Cassini images during that mission's March 2005 flyby of Enceladus. It is located at 20.9° South Latitude, 202.0° West Longitude, and is 10.3 kilometers across. Cassini observed numerous southwest–northeast trending fractures cutting across the southwest rim of Al-Mustazi, forming canyons several hundred meters deep. These fractures were deflected by the weakened regolith produced by the Al-Mustazi impact. This deflection produced the pattern of radiating fractures seen along the northeastern rim of Al-Mustazi.

Al-Mustazi is named after Az-Zahir, a 13th-century Abbasid caliph and a character in "The Hunchback's Tale" from The Book of One Thousand and One Nights.
