= Fitnah (crater) =

Crater on Enceladus

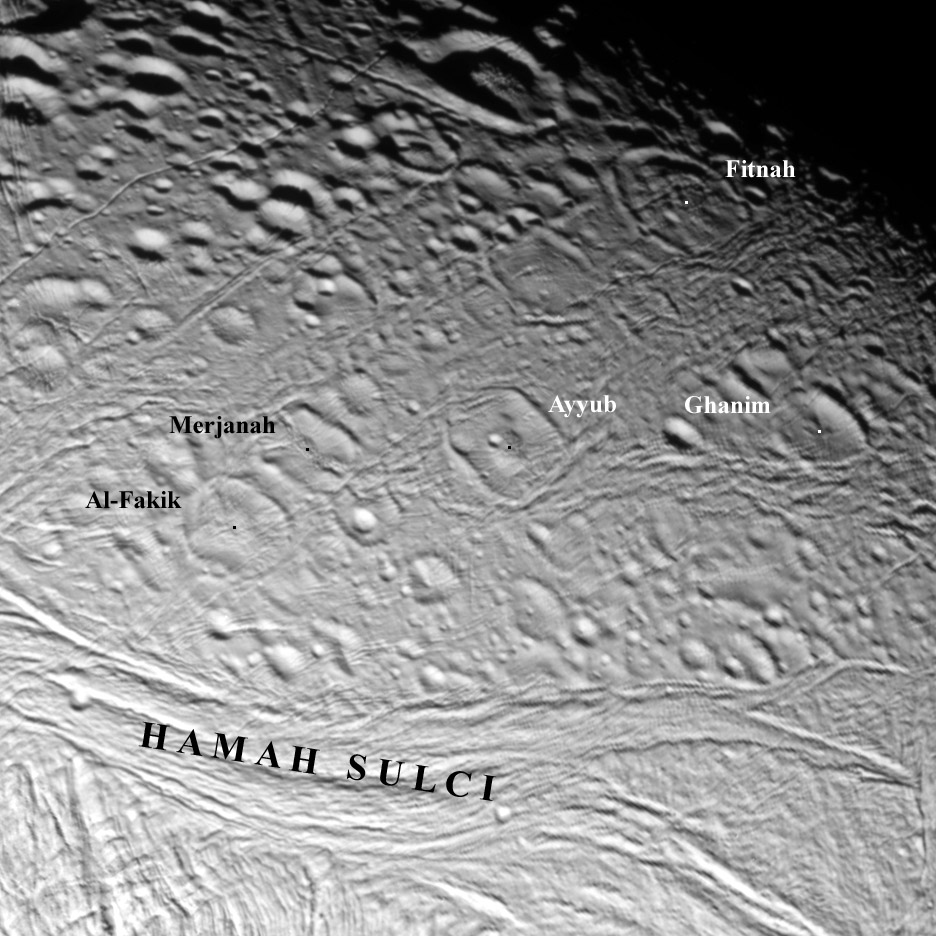
- Fitnah (upper right) as seen by the Cassini spacecraft on February 17, 2005
- Location: 45.06°N 290.63°W
- Diameter: 16.5 km
- Discoverer: Cassini–Huygens
- Naming: Fitnah, a fictional character

Fitnah is an impact crater in the northern hemisphere of Saturn's moon Enceladus. Fitnah was first observed in Cassini–Huygens images during that mission's February 2005 flyby of Enceladus. It is located at 45.1° North Latitude, 290.6° West Longitude and is 16.5 kilometers across. The topography of the impact crater appears very subdued, suggesting that the crater has undergone significant viscous relaxation since its formation, leaving behind only the raised rim behind.

The crater is named after a character from the "Tale of Ghanim bin Ayyub, the Distraught, the Thrall o’ Love" in The Book of One Thousand and One Nights. The character is the daughter of Ayyub and sister of Ghanim, and craters named Ghanim and Ayyub are found near the crater Fitnah.
