= Shirin (crater) =

Crater on Enceladus

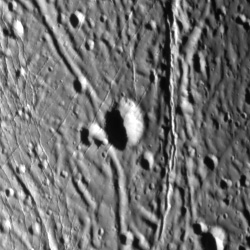
- Shirin (center) as seen by the Cassini spacecraft on March 9, 2005
- Location: 1.9°S 172.44°W
- Diameter: 8.7 km
- Discoverer: Cassini
- Naming: Shirin

Shirin is an impact crater located on the anti-Saturn hemisphere of Saturn's moon Enceladus. Shirin was first observed in Cassini images during that mission's March 2005 flyby of Enceladus. It is located at 1.9° South Latitude, 172.4° West Longitude, and is 8.7 kilometers across. Cassini observed several, narrow, southwest–northeast trending fractures cutting across Shirin, forming canyons up to a hundred metres deep along the crater's rim. Several wider fractures are seen nearby, however these appeared to form before the Shirin impact since the crater appears to cover these fractures as they appear it.

Shirin is named after the wife of Persian Sassanid king Khosrau II and one of the primary characters in the tale "Khusrau and Shirin and the Fisherman" from The Book of One Thousand and One Nights. Khusrau, a crater named after her husband, is located to the west of Shirin crater.
