= Shakashik (crater) =

Crater on Enceladus

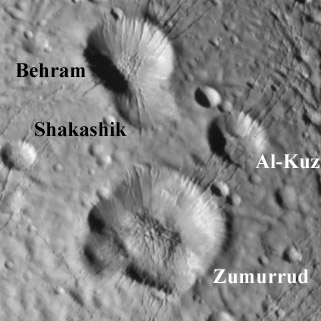
- Shakashik (labeled) as seen by the Cassini spacecraft on July 14, 2005
- Location: 17.27°S 180.82°W
- Diameter: 8.5 km
- Discoverer: Cassini
- Naming: Shakashik; Barber's sixth brother

Shakashik is an impact crater on the anti-Saturn hemisphere of Saturn's moon Enceladus. Shakashik was first observed in Cassini images during that mission's March 2005 flyby of Enceladus. It is located at 17.3° South Latitude, 180.8° West Longitude, and is 8.5 kilometers across. Behram appears to have formed after Shakashik, based on the superposition of the larger crater's southern rim on Shakashik's northern rim. Following the formation of Behram, north–south trending fractures cut across both craters, forming several canyons within the western half of Shakashik.

Shakashik is named after one of the barber's six brothers in "The Hunchback's Tale" from The Book of One Thousand and One Nights.
