= Labtayt Sulci =

Sulci on Enceladus

Coordinates: 28°S 284°W

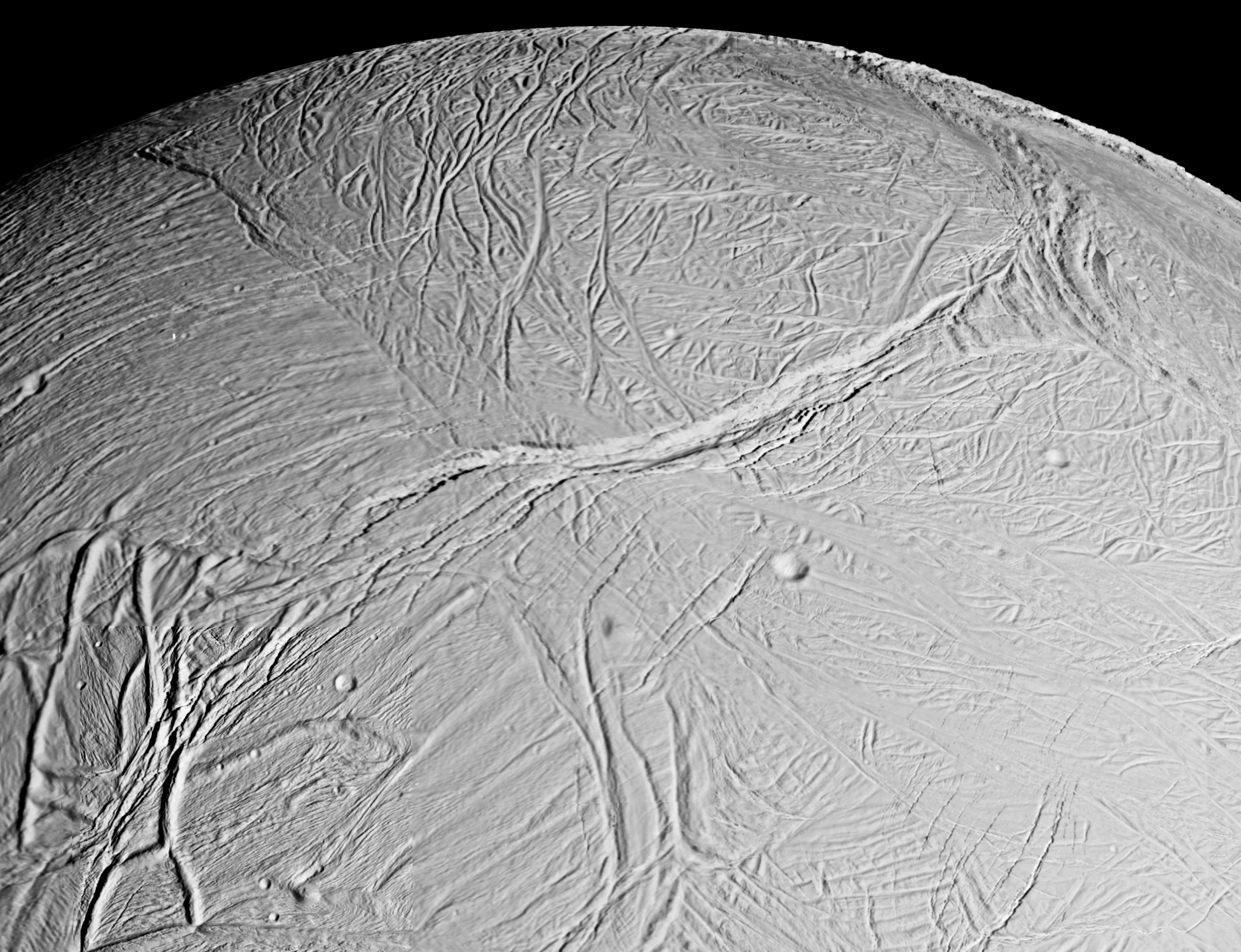
Labtayt Sulci running from left to right across mosaic taken by the Cassini spacecraft on February 17, 2005

Labtayt Sulci is a system of deep fractures on Saturn's moon Enceladus. Labtayt Sulci was first seen in low-resolution Voyager 1 images, but was observed in much more detail by the Cassini spacecraft during its February 2005 flyby of Enceladus. It is centered at 28.0° South Latitude, 284.0° West Longitude and is approximately 162 kilometers long, 4 kilometers wide, and 1 kilometer deep. The association between a cusp along the South Polar terrain boundary and Labtayt suggests that the fracture was forced open by thrust faulting where the fracture intersects with Cashmere Sulci.

Labtayt Sulci is named after Labtayt, the capital of Roum in the tale "The City of Labtayt", from the book One Thousand and One Nights.
