= Al-Fakik =

Crater on Enceladus

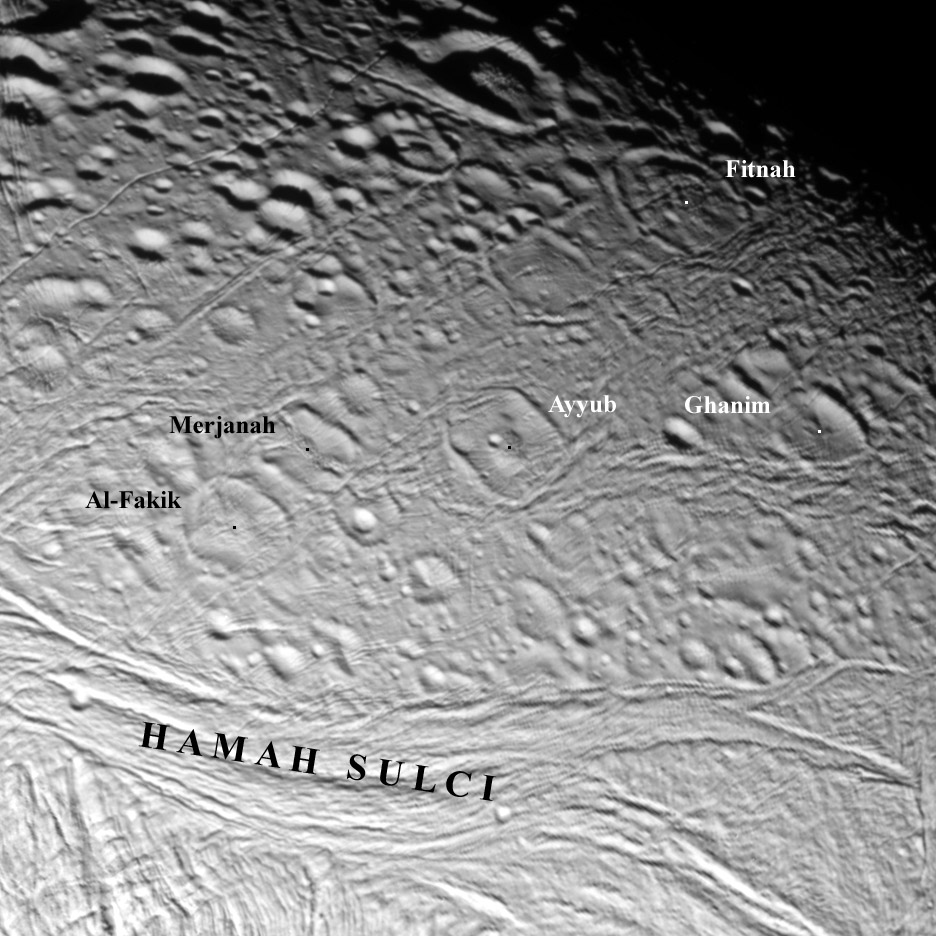
- Al-Fakik (center left) as seen by the Cassini spacecraft on February 17, 2005
- Location: 35.54°N 307.3°W
- Diameter: 16.5 km
- Discoverer: Cassini
- Naming: Al-Fakik; Barber's blind brother

Al-Fakik is an impact crater in the northern hemisphere of Saturn's moon Enceladus. Al-Fakik was first observed in Cassini images during that mission's February 2005 flyby of Enceladus. It is located at 35.5° North Latitude, 307.3° West Longitude and is 16.5 kilometers across. The topography of the impact crater appears very subdued, suggesting that the crater has undergone significant viscous relaxation since its formation. In addition, fractures have disrupted the southeastern margin of the crater.

Al-Fakik is named after the Baghdad barber's fast-talking, blind brother, whose story is recounted in "The Tale of the Barber's Third Brother" in The Book of One Thousand and One Nights.
