= Daryabar Fossa =

Trough on Enceladus

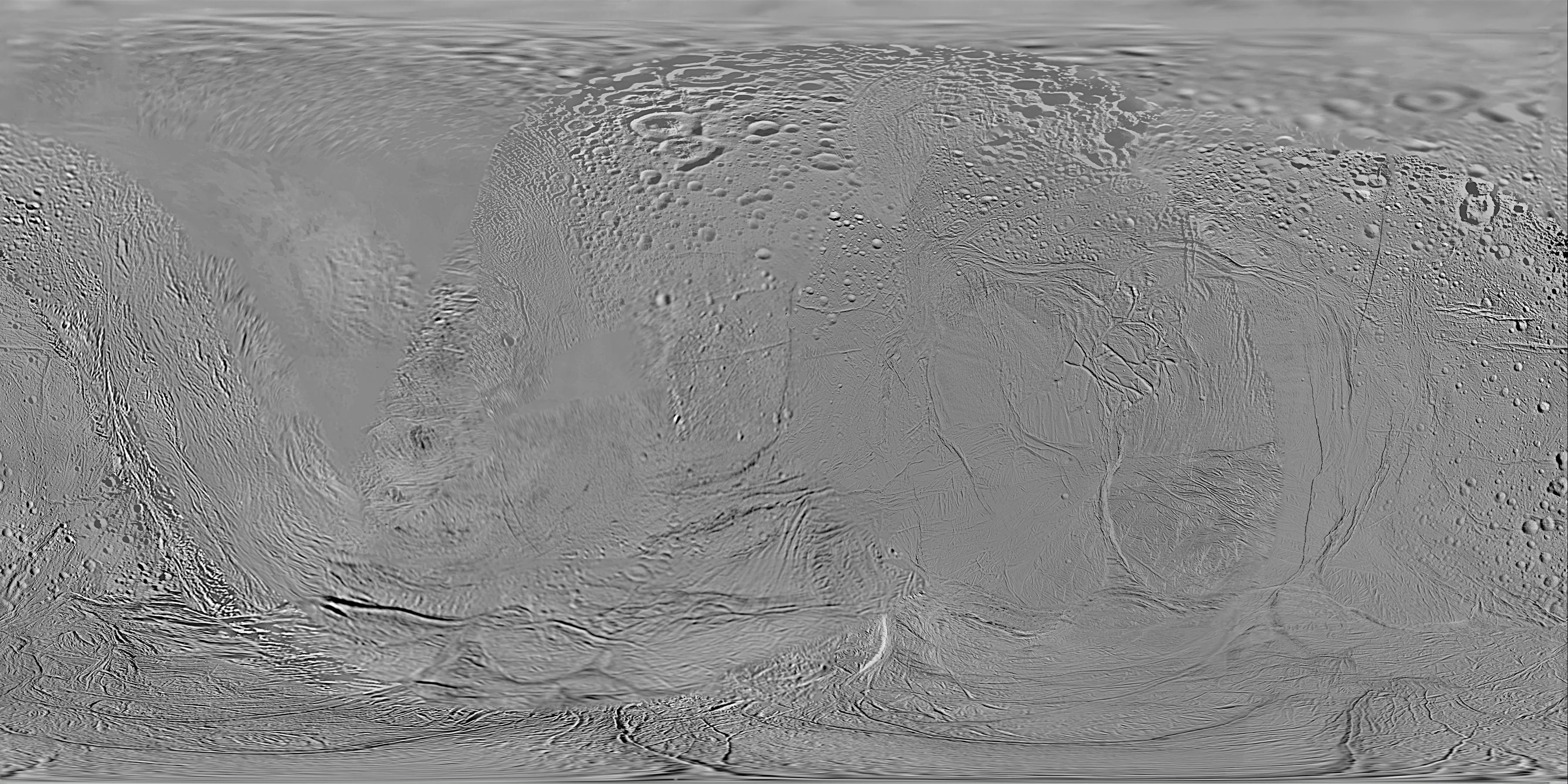
Saturn's moon Enceladus

Daryabar Fossa is an east–west trending trough on Saturn's moon Enceladus. Daryabar Fossa was first seen in Voyager 2 images, though a small section was seen at much higher resolution by Cassini. It is centered at 9.7° North Latitude, 359.1° West Longitude and is approximately 201 kilometers long. Based on limb profiles of Voyager 2 images, Daryabar Fossa was determined to be a 400-meter deep and 4 kilometers wide (Kargel and Pozio 1996). Daryabar Fossa runs perpendicular to the scarp Isbanir Fossa and is right-laterally offset 15–20 km by the scarp, suggesting Isbanir is a strike-slip or transform fault (Rothery 1999).

Daryabar Fossa is named for the land from which Princess Daryabar came in One Thousand and One Nights. The word Daryabar is Persian دریابار and means "Seaside".
