= Ghanima (disambiguation) =

Ghanima is an Arabic word ("الْغَنيمَة") meaning “spoils of war” which include land, wealth, cattle, women and children.

It can refer to:

- Ghanima, items subject to the Islamic wealth tax Khums
- Yousef VII Ghanima, patriarch of the Chaldean Catholic Church from 1947 to 1958

In fiction

- Ghanima Atreides, a character in Herbert's novel Children of Dune
