= Aladdin (crater) =

Crater on Saturn's moon Enceladus

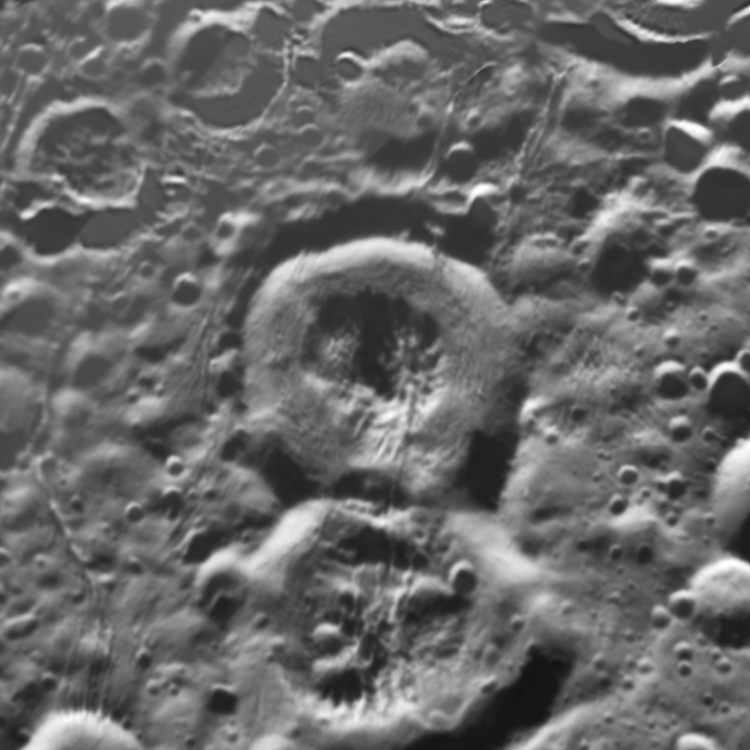
- Aladdin crater (center)
- Location: 60.69°N 26.66°W
- Diameter: 37.4 km
- Discoverer: Voyager 2
- Naming: Hero from Arabian Nights who finds a magic lamp

Aladdin is a crater in the northern hemisphere of Saturn's moon Enceladus. Aladdin was first discovered in Voyager 2 images. It is located at 60.7° North Latitude, 26.7° West Longitude and is 37.4 kilometers across. It is located near the craters Ali Baba and Samad. Aladdin has a large dome in its interior, suggesting the crater has undergone some viscous relaxation.

Aladdin is named after a famous hero from Arabian Nights who finds a magic lamp.
