= Al-Kuz =

Crater on Enceladus

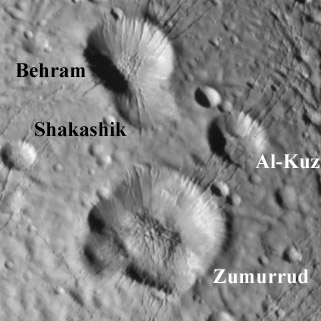
- Al-Kuz (left center) as seen by the Cassini spacecraft on July 14, 2005
- Location: 18.66°S 178.23°W
- Diameter: 9.3 km
- Discoverer: Cassini
- Naming: Al-Kuz; Barber's fourth brother

Al-Kuz is an impact crater on the anti-Saturn hemisphere of Saturn's moon Enceladus. Al-Kuz was first observed in Cassini images during that mission's March 2005 flyby of Enceladus. It is located at 18.7° South Latitude, 178.2° West Longitude, and is 9.3 kilometers across. Since the crater's formation, numerous southwest–northeast trending fractures cut across the crater, forming canyons several hundred meters deep along the crater's rim. In addition, a smaller impact occurred along the northern crater wall, forming a crater 4 kilometers wide.

Al-Kuz is named after one of the barber's six brothers in "The Hunchback's Tale" in The Book of One Thousand and One Nights.
