= Gharib (crater) =

Crater on Enceladus

- Location: 81.12°N 241.15°W
- Diameter: 26 km
- Discoverer: Voyager 2
- Naming: hero from Arabian Nights

Gharib is a crater near the north pole of Saturn's moon Enceladus. Gharib was first seen in Voyager 2 images. It is located at 81.1° North Latitude, 241.2° West Longitude and is 26 kilometers across. A large, dome-like structure occupies the interior of the crater, suggesting the crater has undergone significant viscous relaxation.

Gharib is named after a hero from Arabian Nights.
