= Ghanim (crater) =

Crater on Enceladus

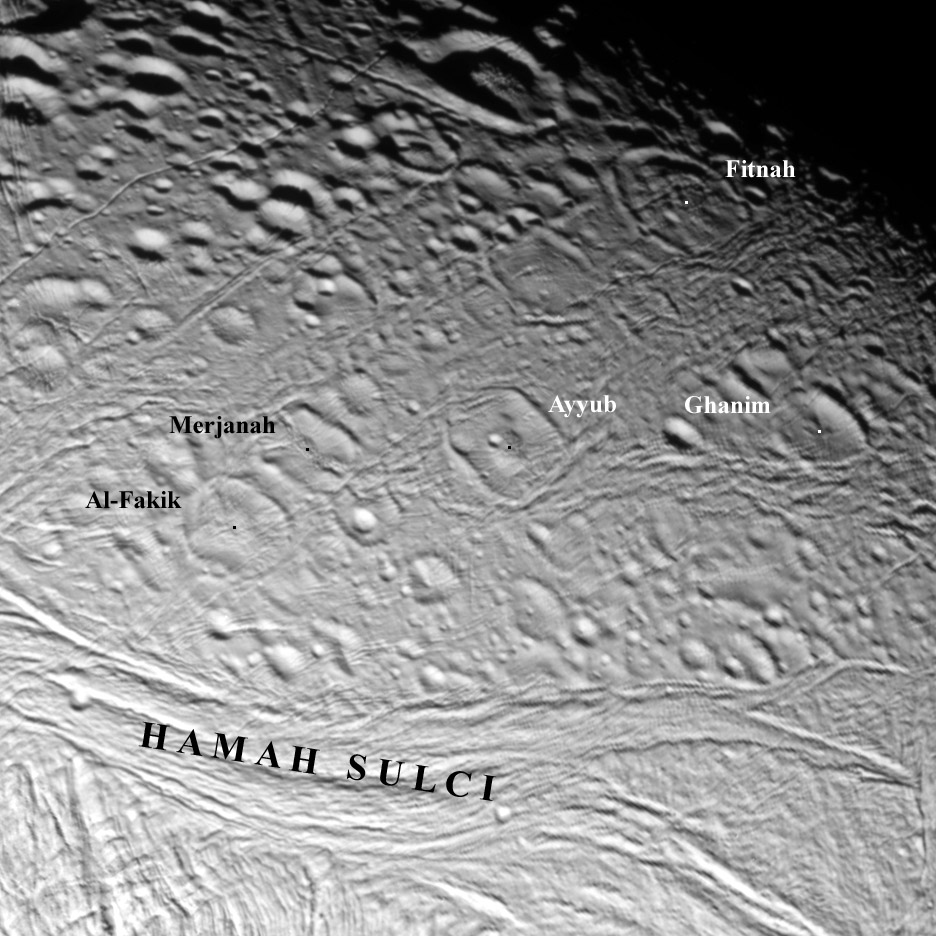
- Ghanim (center right) as seen by the Cassini spacecraft on February 17, 2005
- Location: 38.45°N 281.5°W
- Diameter: 13.9 km
- Discoverer: Cassini
- Naming: Ghanim, a fictional character

Ghanim is an impact crater in the northern hemisphere of Saturn's moon Enceladus. Ghanim was first observed in Cassini images during that mission's February 2005 flyby of Enceladus. It is located at 38.5° North Latitude, 281.5° West Longitude and is 13.9 kilometers across. The topography of the impact crater appears very subdued, suggesting that the crater has undergone significant viscous relaxation since its formation. Tectonics has also affected this crater, by influencing the final, polygonal shape of the crater as well disrupting the southeastern and northwestern margins of the crater following its formation.

The crater is named after Ghanim bin Ayyub (Ghanim, son of Ayyub), the title character of the "Tale of Ghanim bin Ayyub, the Distraught, the Thrall o’ Love" in The Book of One Thousand and One Nights. Incidentally, craters named after Ghanim's father, Ayyub, and sister, Fitnah, are found nearby.
