= Dunyazad (crater) =

Crater on Saturn's moon Enceladus

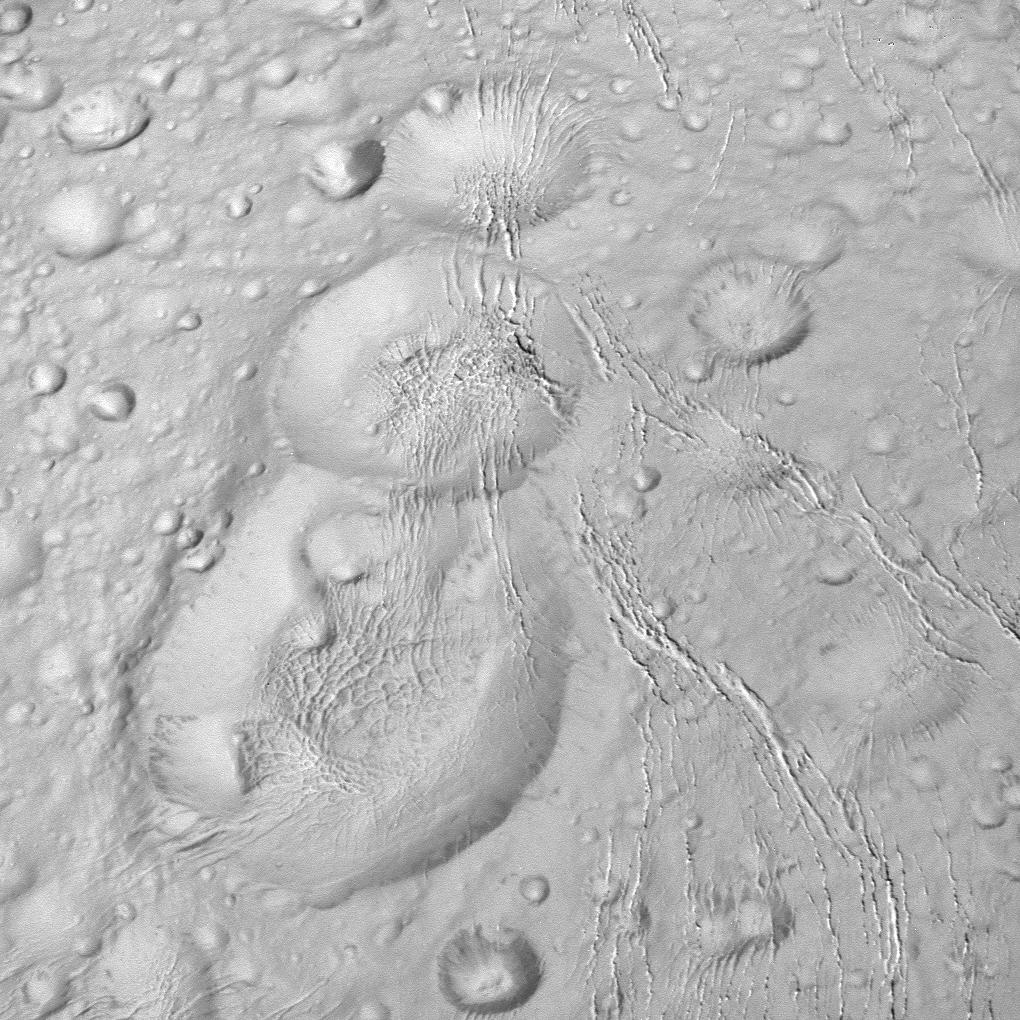
- Dunyazad crater (bottom) as seen by the Cassini spacecraft
- Location: 41.9°N 200.6°W
- Diameter: 31 km
- Discoverer: Voyager 2
- Naming: Dunyazad; Sister of Scheherazade

Dunyazad is a large crater on Saturn's moon Enceladus first discovered by the Voyager 2 spacecraft. It is named after Dunyazad, the sister of Scheherazade in The Book of One Thousand and One Nights.

Dunyazad is located at 41.9°N 200.6°W and is approximately 31 kilometers across, making it one of the largest craters on Enceladus. It is the southernmost crater of a prominent crater triplet on Enceladus' anti-Saturnian hemisphere (there is no evidence that the impacts are related or were formed from break-up of a single body, like Shoemaker-Levy 9). The craters to its north are Shahrazad, and Al-Haddar. Voyager 2 discovery images of this crater revealed an up-domed floor at Dunyazad, suggesting that the crater had been modified by viscous relaxation. Higher resolution views of Dunyazad taken by the Cassini Spacecraft during a close flyby on March 9, 2005 reveal not only an up-domed floor, but numerous tectonic fractures as well, particularly within the dome and northeastern crater rim.
