= Khusrau (crater) =

Crater on Enceladus

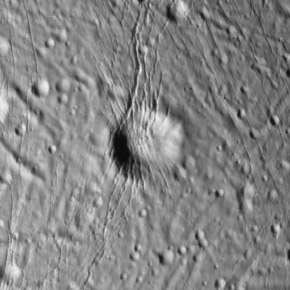
- Khusrau (center) as seen by the Cassini spacecraft on March 9, 2005
- Location: 3.77°S 185.47°W
- Diameter: 12.3 km
- Discoverer: Cassini
- Naming: Khosrau II; Sassanid ruler

Khusrau is an impact crater on the anti-Saturn hemisphere of Saturn's moon Enceladus. Khusrau was first observed in Cassini images during that mission's March 2005 flyby of Enceladus. It is located at 3.8° South Latitude, 185.5° West Longitude, and is 12.3 kilometers across. Since the crater's formation, numerous criss-crossing fractures cut across the crater, forming canyons several hundred meters deep along the crater's rim.

Khusrau is named after Sassanid ruler Khosrau II, one of the main characters from "Khusrau and Shirin and the Fisherman", in The Book of One Thousand and One Nights.
