= Rayya (crater) =

Crater on Enceladus

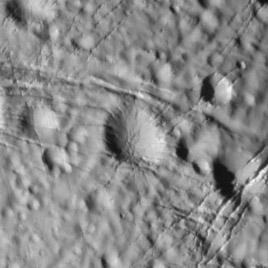
- Rayya (center) as seen by the Cassini spacecraft on July 14, 2005
- Location: 32.45°S 178.41°W
- Diameter: 9 km
- Discoverer: Cassini
- Naming: Otbah and Rayya

Rayya is an impact crater on the southern hemisphere of Saturn's moon Enceladus. Rayya was first observed in Cassini images during that mission's March 2005 flyby of Enceladus. It is located at 32.5° South Latitude, 178.4° West Longitude, and is 9 kilometers across. Cassini observed numerous criss-crossing sets of fractures cutting across Rayya, forming canyons several hundred meters deep along the crater's rim.

Rayya is named after one of the main characters in the tale "Otbah and Rayya" from The Book of One Thousand and One Nights. A crater named after the other main character, Otbah, is nearby.
