= Otbah (crater) =

Crater on Enceladus

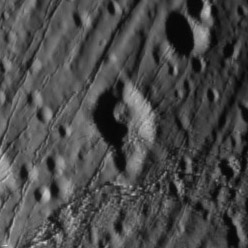
- Otbah (center) as seen by the Cassini spacecraft on July 14, 2005
- Location: 39.8°S 159.51°W
- Diameter: 9.4 km
- Discoverer: Cassini
- Naming: Otbah

Otbah is an impact crater on the southern hemisphere of Saturn's moon Enceladus. Otbah was first observed in Cassini images during that mission's March 2005 flyby of Enceladus. It is located at 39.8° South Latitude, 159.5° West Longitude, and is 9.4 kilometers across. A smaller impact occurred after the Otbah impact on the larger crater's southern rim, forming an impact crater 3 kilometers across. In addition to subsequent cratering, southwest–northeast trending fractures, prevalent in this region of Enceladus, cut across Otbah, forming several canyons several hundred meters deep along Otbah's rim. The high level of tectonic activity associated with this fracturing and the formation of the nearby south polar terrain may have also led to mass wasting along the crater's wall, leading to a 3 kilometer wide landslide deposit in the center of Otbah.

Otbah is named after one of the main characters in the tale "Otbah and Rayya" from The Book of One Thousand and One Nights. A crater named after the other main character, Rayya, is nearby.
