= Sindbad (crater) =

Crater on Enceladus

- Location: 67°N 212.07°W
- Diameter: 29.1 km
- Discoverer: Voyager 2
- Naming: Sindbad; Sailor of seven voyages

Sindbad is a crater in the northern hemisphere of Saturn's moon Enceladus. Sindbad was first seen in Voyager 2 images, though the southern rim has been seen by Cassini. It is located at 67° North Latitude, 212° West Longitude and is 29.1 kilometers across. A large, dome-like structure occupies the interior of the crater, suggesting the crater has undergone significant viscous relaxation.

Sindbad is named after a character from Arabian Nights. The stories of his seven voyages make up a number of tales in Arabian Nights.
