= List of geological features on Dione =

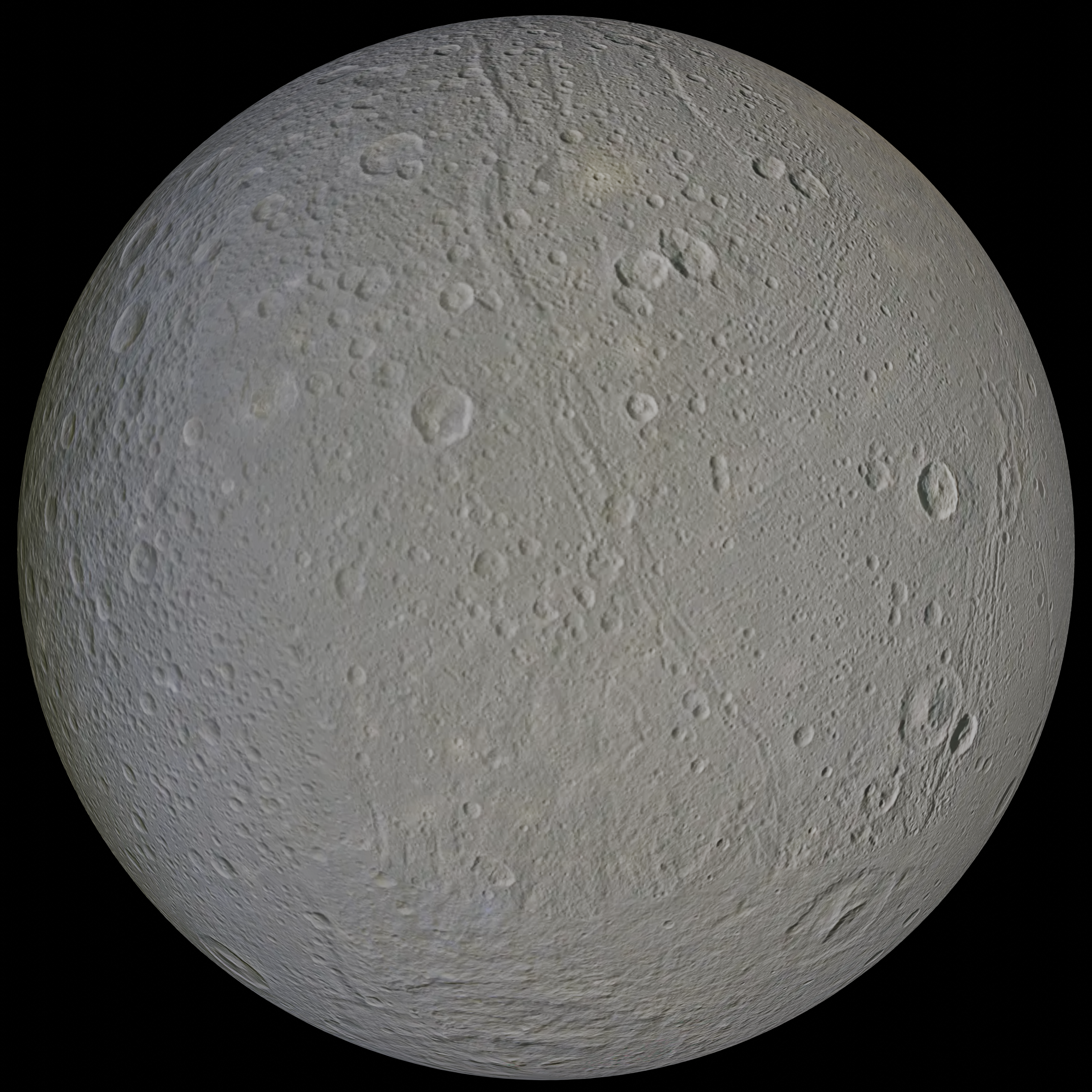
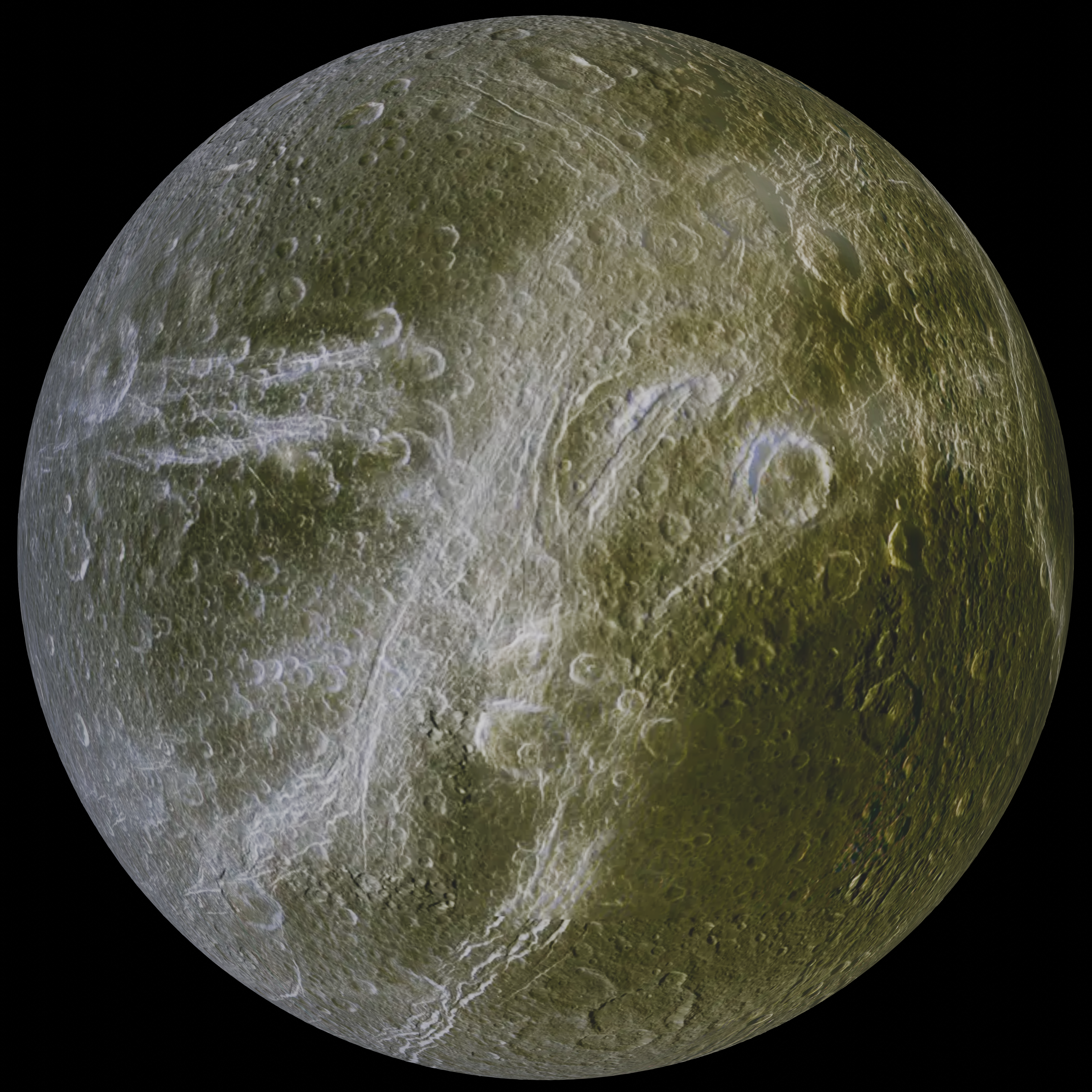

This is a list of named geological features on Dione, a moon of Saturn. Dionean geological features are named after people and places in Roman mythology.

== Catenae ==
Catenae are crater chains. They are named after rivers in Roman mythology.

Catena	Pronunciation	Coordinates	Length (km)	Approval date	Named after	Refs
Aufidus Catena	/ˈɔːfɪdəs/	78.0°S 296.4°W	275	2008	Aufidus, river in southern Italy	WGPSN
Pactolus Catena	/pækˈtoʊləs/	8.79°N 327.15°W	180	2008	Pactolus, river in Lydia	WGPSN
Pantagias Catenae	/pænˈteɪdʒiəs/	15.3°S 141.7°W	200	2008	Pantagias, river in Sicily	WGPSN

== Chasmata ==
Dionean chasms or canyons are called chasmata /ˈkæzmətə/. They are named after important locations in Roman mythology and history.

Chasmata	Pronunciation	Coordinates	Length (km)	Approval date	Named after	Refs
Aurunca Chasmata	/ɔːˈrʌŋkə/	11.56°N 266.7°W	290	2008	Aurunca, Campania	WGPSN
Drepanum Chasma	/ˈdrɛpənəm/	46°N 265°W	360	2008	Drepanum, Sicily	WGPSN
Eurotas Chasmata	/jʊˈroʊtəs/	4.94°N 301.35°W	1000	2008	Eurotas River, Peloponnese	WGPSN
Larissa Chasma	/ləˈrɪsə/	28.98°N 69.5°W	150	1982	Larissa, Thessaly	WGPSN
Latium Chasma	/ˈleɪʃiəm/	20°N 63.93°W	360	1982	Latium, Italy	WGPSN
Padua Chasmata	/ˈpædjuə/	17.7°N 247.17°W	1025	2008	Padua, Veneto	WGPSN
Palatine Chasmata	/ˈpælətaɪn/	48°S 316°W	1100	1982	Palatine Hill, Rome	WGPSN
Tibur Chasma	/ˈtaɪbər/	60°N 69.3°W	156	1982	Tibur, Lazio	WGPSN

== Dorsa ==
Dionean ridges are called dorsa. They are named after Roman hills.

Dorsa	Pronunciation	Coordinates	Length (km)	Approval date	Named after	Refs
Janiculum Dorsa	/dʒəˈnɪkjʊləm/	24.6°N 144.1°W	900	2008	Janiculum, Rome	WGPSN

== Fossae ==
Dionean fossae /ˈfɒsiː/ (long narrow depressions) are named after cities, streets and rivers in Roman mythology.

Fossa	Pronunciation	Coordinates	Length (km)	Approval date	Named after	Refs
Argiletum Fossae	/ɑːrdʒɪˈliːtəm/	65.18°N 32.1°W	224	2011	Argiletum, a street near the forum of ancient Rome	WGPSN
Arpi Fossae	/ˈɑːrpaɪ/	47.47°N 130.8°W	330	2008	Arpi, Apulia	WGPSN
Carthage Fossae	/ˈkɑːrθədʒ/	11.93°N 336.17°W	500	2008	Carthage, Tunisia	WGPSN
Clusium Fossae	/ˈkluːsiəm/	39.27°N 301.54°W	260	2008	Clusium, Tuscany	WGPSN
Fidena Fossae	/fɪˈdiːnə/	0.66°N 96°W	550	2008	Fidenae, Latium	WGPSN
Helorus Fossa	/hɪˈlɔːrəs/	31.84°S 76.48°W	105	2011	river Helorus, Sicily	WGPSN
Himella Fossa	/hɪˈmɛlə/	45.6°S 336.55°W	147	2011	river Himella, a tributary of the Tiber	WGPSN
Petelia Fossae	/pɪˈtiːliə/	8.16°S 82.43°W	225	2008	Petelia, Calabria	WGPSN

== Lineae ==
Originally, three geological features were labelled lineae (bright wispy markings). However, later evidence from the Cassini probe revealed them to be icy chasms, and they were all renamed as such (see above).

== Craters ==
Dionean craters are named after figures from Greek and Roman mythology, especially Virgil's The Aeneid.

Crater	Pronunciation	Coordinates	Diameter (km)	Approval date	Named after	Refs
Acestes	/əˈsɛstiːz/	50.1°N 243.37°W	108	2008	Acestes, King of Sicily	WGPSN
Adrastus	/əˈdræstəs/	61.66°S 46.57°W	38.5	1982	Adrastus, King of Argos	WGPSN
Aeneas	/ɪˈniːəs/	25.89°N 46.27°W	161	1982	Aeneas, Trojan Prince	WGPSN
Alcander	/ælˈkændər/	52.89°S 295.49°W	120	2011	Alcander, Trojan defending Aeneas’ camp against the Rutulians, killed by Turnus	WGPSN
Allecto	/əˈlɛktoʊ/	7.73°S 224.56°W	106	2008	Allecto, one of the Furies.	WGPSN
Amastrus	/əˈmæstrəs/	9.96°S 237.03°W	62.4	2008	Amastrus, Trojan warrior	WGPSN
Amata	/əˈmeɪtə/	5.17°N 279.81°W	76	1982	Amata, Queen of the Latins	WGPSN
Amycus	/ˈæmɪkəs/	37.52°S 88.62°W	27.3	2008	Amycus, a Trojan, comrade of Aeneas.	WGPSN
Anchises	/æŋˈkaɪsiːz/	34°S 65°W	47	1982	Anchises, Dardanian king	WGPSN
Anna	/ˈænə/	63.38°S 89.96°W	14.2	2008	Anna, sister and confidante of Dido.	WGPSN
Antenor	/ænˈtiːnɔːr/	7°S 11.54°W	81	1982	Antenor, Trojan prince	WGPSN
Ascanius	/əˈskeɪniəs/	33.43°N 232.18°W	98	2008	Ascanius, son of Aeneas by Creusa	WGPSN
Assaracus	/əˈsærəkəs/	32.65°N 8.79°W	60	2011	Assaracus, early king of Troy, son of Tros, brother of Ilus and Ganymede	WGPSN
Aulestes	/ɔːˈlɛstiːz/	9.9°N 147.73°W	50	2008	Aulestes, Etruscan chief, ally of Aeneas.	WGPSN
Butes	/ˈbjuːtiːz/	65.72°N 46.4°W	35	1982	Butes, boxer	WGPSN
Caieta	/keɪˈiːtə/	24.71°S 79.63°W	50	1982	Caieta, Trojan nurse	WGPSN
Camilla	/kəˈmɪlə/	4.36°S 60.61°W	31.9	2008	Camilla, Volscian queen	WGPSN
Cassandra	/kəˈsændrə/	39.84°S 246.22°W	13	1982	Cassandra, Trojan princess	WGPSN
Catillus	/kəˈtɪləs/	2.38°S 275.3°W	42.2	1982	Catillus the Arcadian, founder of Tibur	WGPSN
Coras	/ˈkɔːrəs/	0.39°N 268.45°W	43	1982	Coras, founder of Tibur	WGPSN
Cretheus	/ˈkriːθiːəs/	43.35°S 88.53°W	29	2008	A Trojan warrior who took part in the defense of Aeneas’ camp against the Rutulians	WGPSN
Creusa	/ˈkruːsə/	49.19°N 76.32°W	36.2	1982	Creusa, Trojan princess	WGPSN
Daucus	/ˈdɔːkəs/	15.38°S 301.14°W	80	2008	A Rutulian, father of the twins Thymber and Larides.	WGPSN
Dercennus	/dərˈsɛnəs/	29.75°N 279.93°W	86.2	2008	Ancient king of the Laurentians.	WGPSN
Dido	/ˈdaɪdoʊ/	23.97°S 18.82°W	122	1982	Dido, Carthaginian queen	WGPSN
Entellus	/ɛnˈtɛləs/	10.93°S 210.54°W	63	2008	Sicilian boxing champion.	WGPSN
Erulus	/ˈɛrʊləs/	35°S 104.76°W	120	2008	Superhuman son of the goddess Feronia.	WGPSN
Eumelus	/juːˈmiːləs/	0.1°S 65.96°W	35.1	2008	A Trojan companion of Aeneas.	WGPSN
Euryalus	/jʊˈraɪləs/	74.36°S -0°E	35	2008	A Trojan companion of Aeneas, friend of Nisus.	WGPSN
Evander	/ɪˈvændər/	57°S 145°W	350	2008	Evander, Roman hero	WGPSN
Fadus	/ˈfeɪdəs/	35.94°S 225.18°W	47	2011	A Rutulian of those besieging the men of Aeneas in their leader's absence.	WGPSN
Galaesus	/ɡəˈliːsəs/	46.77°N 296.25°W	79	2011	An old Italian killed in the first fighting between Latins and Trojans while trying to make peace.	WGPSN
Haemon	/ˈhiːmən/	84.33°N 276.31°W	65.22	2011	There are two persons in the Aeneid with this name: (a) a Rutulian from a group attacking the Trojan's camp in the absence of Aeneas, and (b) an Italian whose son, priest of Apollo and Diana, was a soldier of Turnus.	WGPSN
Halys	/ˈheɪlɪs/	59.17°S 53.72°W	35.2	1982	Halys, Trojan warrior	WGPSN
Herbesus	/həɹbɛsəs/	34.68°N 156.11°W	58.4	2008	A Rutulian who besieged Aeneas' camp.	WGPSN
Iasus	?/ˈaɪəsəs/	22.13°S 245.92°W	54	2011	There are two persons in the Aeneid with this name: (a) father of Palinurus, and (b) father of Iapyx.	WGPSN
Ilia	/ˈɪliə/	0.5°S 346.27°W	52.4	1982	Alternate name of Rhea Silvia, mother of Romulus and Remus	WGPSN
Italus	/ˈɪtələs/	18.47°S 76.41°W	35.7	1982	Italus, ancient hero, eponymous ancestor of the Italians	WGPSN
Lagus	/ˈleɪɡəs/	13.56°S 102.95°W	77	2008	A soldier of Turnus.	WGPSN
Lamyrus	/ˈlæmɪrəs/	53.67°N 255.61°W	61	2011	A Rutulian with the troops besieging the camp of Aeneas.	WGPSN
Larides	/laɹədiːz/	7.17°N 311.42°W	29	2008	A Rutulian, member of Turnus’ army, son of Daucus, twin brother of Thymber.	WGPSN
Latagus	/lat̤ʌgəs/	14.65°N 26.46°W	41	1982	Latagus, Trojan soldier	WGPSN
Latinus	/ləˈtaɪnəs/	52.19°N 201°W	130	2008	King of Latium, husband of Amata.	WGPSN
Lausus	/ˈlɔːsəs/	34.81°N 22.76°W	23.5	1982	Lausus, Etruscan prince	WGPSN
Liger	/ˈlaɪdʒər/	24°N 126.63°W	53	2008	Soldier of Turnus, brother of Lucagus.	WGPSN
Lucagus	/ˈljuːkəɡəs/	22.15°N 131.25°W	45.7	2008	Soldier of Turnus, brother of Liger.	WGPSN
Magus	/ˈmeɪɡəs/	18.44°N 24.35°W	45.8	1982	Magus, Rutulian soldier	WGPSN
Massicus	/ˈmæsɪkəs/	35°S 55.39°W	39	1982	Massicus	WGPSN
Metiscus	/mɪˈtɪskəs/	6°N 93.29°W	43.8	2008	A Rutulian, charioteer of Turnus.	WGPSN
Mezentius	/mɪˈzɛntiəs/	19.16°N 183°W	51	2008	Etruscan king, ally of Turnus, father of Lausus.	WGPSN
Murranus	/məˈreɪnəs/	12.82°N 90.73°W	56.8	2008	A Rutulian.	WGPSN
Nisus	/ˈnaɪsəs/	68.18°S 335°W	35	2008	Trojan companion of Aeneas, friend of Euryalus.	WGPSN
Oebalus	/ˈiːbələs/	44.47°N 351.6°W	35.7	2011	An ally of Turnus, son of Telon and Sebethis.	WGPSN
Pagasus	/ˈpæɡəsəs/	3°S 241°W	67	2008	An Etruscan killed by Camilla.	WGPSN
Palinurus	/pælɪˈnjʊərəs/	3.3°S 63°W	11.9	1982	Palinurus	WGPSN
Phaleris	?/fəˈlɪərɪs/	77.4°S 166.58°W	44	2008	Trojan defending Aeneas' camp against Rutulian attack.	WGPSN
Phorbas	/ˈfɔːrbəs/	81.2°N 131.29°W	69.3	2011	A Trojan, companion of Aeneas.	WGPSN
Prytanis	/ˈprɪtənɪs/	46.25°S 287.4°W	96	2008	Trojan defending Aeneas' camp against Rutulian attack.	WGPSN
Remus	/ˈriːməs/	13.58°S 31.9°W	62	1982	Remus	WGPSN
Ripheus	/ˈrɪfiːəs/	56.47°S 36.8°W	34	1982	Ripheus	WGPSN
Romulus	/ˈrɒmjʊləs/	8.15°S 26.85°W	90.7	1982	Romulus	WGPSN
Sabinus	/səˈbaɪnəs/	43.65°S 186.66°W	88	1982	Sabines	WGPSN
Sagaris	/ˈsæɡərɪs/	4.93°N 104.2°W	53	2008	Servant of Aeneas.	WGPSN
Salius	/ˈseɪliəs/	65.09°N 181.73°W	44	2011	There are two persons in the Aeneid with this name: (a) a companion of Aeneas and a contestant in the foot race, and (b) a Rutulian.	WGPSN
Silvius	/ˈsɪlviəs/	32.7°S 332.26°W	74	2008	Son of Aeneas and Lavinia.	WGPSN
Sulmo	/ˈsʌlmoʊ/	55.92°N 333.5°W	56	2011	There are two persons in the Aeneid with this name: (a) a Rutulian in the troop of Volcens, and (b) an Italian whose sons fought for Turnus.	WGPSN
Telon	/ˈtiːlɒn/	16.2°S 97.2°W	39.7	2011	Ruler of the Teleboans on Capri; father of Oebalus.	WGPSN
Tereus	/ˈtɪəriːəs/	2.6°S 245°W	39.7	2008	A Trojan, killed by Camilla.	WGPSN
Thymber	/ˈθɪmbər/	14°N 309.15°W	27.29	2008	A Rutulian, member of Turnus’ army, son of Daucus, twin brother of Larides.	WGPSN
Tiburtus	/tɪˈbɜːrtəs/	29.11°N 189.73°W	59	2008	Brother of the twins Catillus and Coras, founder of Tibur to which he gave his name.	WGPSN
Turnus	/ˈtɜːrnəs/	15.59°N 345.31°W	101	1982	Turnus	WGPSN
Tyrrhus	/ˈtɪrəs/	24.7°N 287.9°W	49.1	2008	Keeper of the herds for Latinus, father of Silvia.	WGPSN
Volcens	/ˈvɒlsɛnz/	13.84°S 268.51°W	74	2011	A Latin, leader of cavalry sent as reinforcements to Turnus	WGPSN

== See also ==
- List of quadrangles on Dione
