= Multi-ringed basin =

Crater containing multiple concentric topographic rings

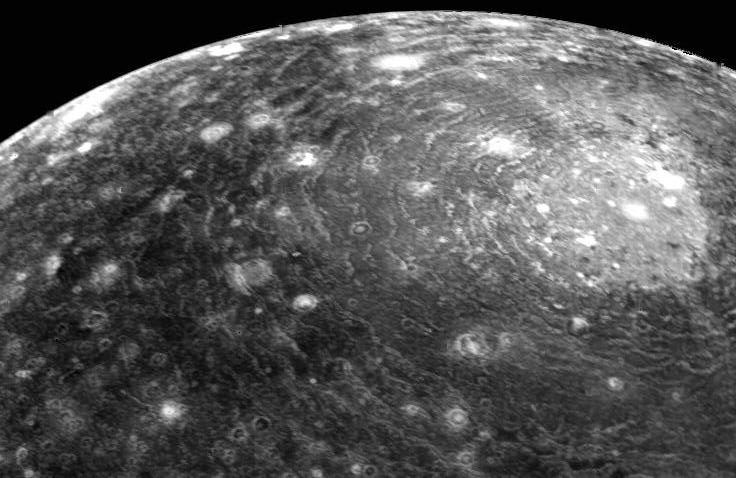
Valhalla Basin on Jupiter's moon Callisto, taken by Voyager 1

A multi-ringed basin (also a multi-ring impact basin) is not a simple bowl-shaped crater, or a peak ring crater, but one containing multiple concentric topographic rings; a multi-ringed basin could be described as a massive impact crater, surrounded by circular chains of mountains resembling rings on a bull's-eye. A multi-ringed basin may have an area of many thousands of square kilometres.

An impact crater of diameter bigger than about 180 miles (290 km) is referred to as a basin.

== Structure ==
More common peak ring craters have: (1) a peak-ring, i.e., a crater rim, which is generally circular, and; (2) a mountainous region which surrounds the center of the crater basin. In contrast, a multi-ringed basin has multiple peak-rings displaying as further concentric circles.

In extremely large collisions, the rebound of the surface after impact can obliterate any trace of the initial impact point. Usually, a peak ring crater has a high structure with a terrace and has slump structures inside of it.

In adjacent rings, the ratio of the diameters approximates √2:1 ≈ 1.41 to 1.

== Formation ==
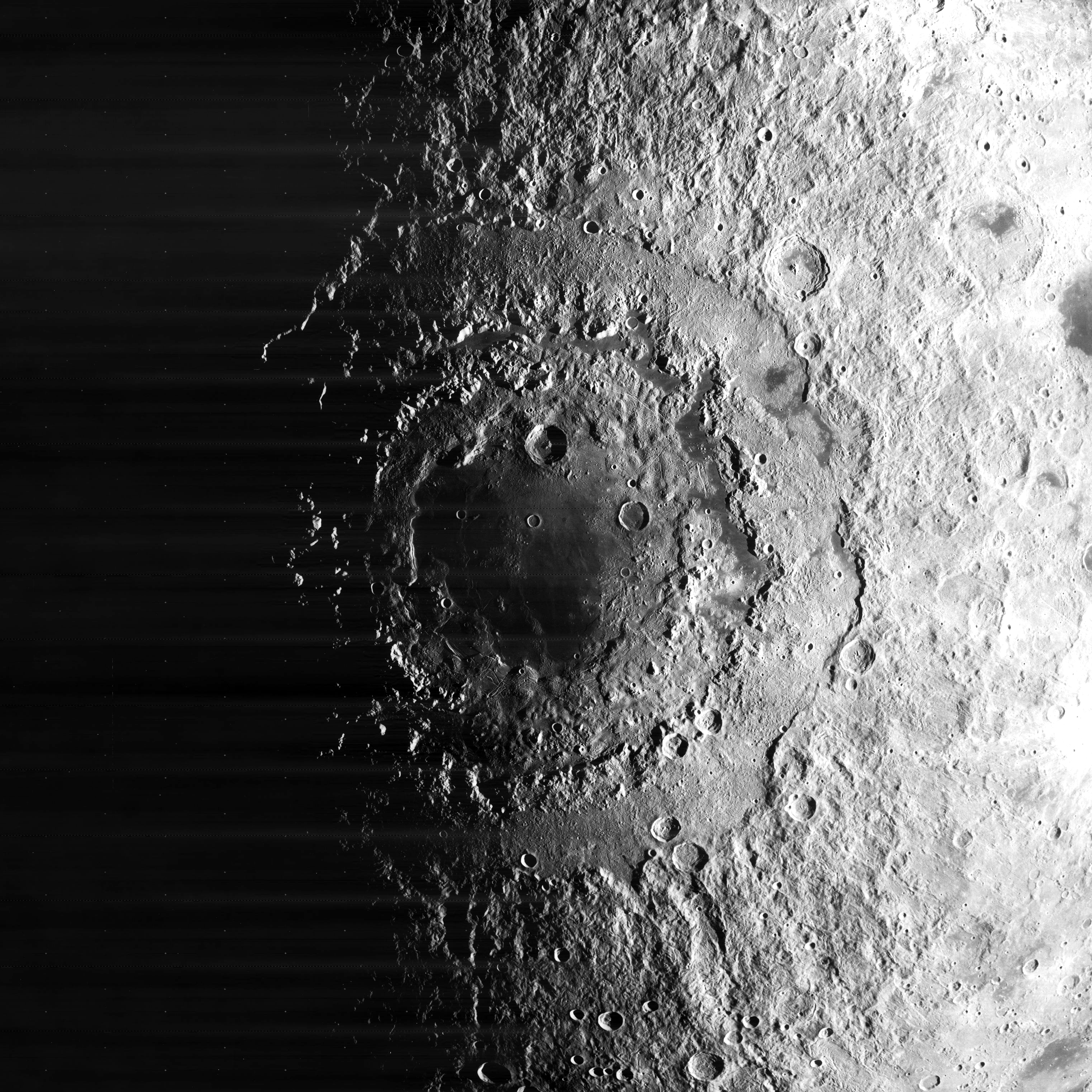
Mare Orientale, on Earth's Moon

Multi-ring basins are some of the largest, oldest, rarest and least understood of impact craters. There are various hypotheses to explain the formation of multi-ringed basins, including harmonic oscillations as is observed when a pebble is dropped on calm water, and brittle terrace faulting; however, there is currently no consensus.

In 2016, research brought forward new hypotheses about the formation of the lunar mare called Mare Orientale on Earth's Moon. Prior to this research, the most accepted explanation was the 'slumping/megaterrace' model, which suggested that a deep bowl-shaped basin forms during the impact and that subsidence along faults later produces the ring formations, though this hypothesis was always considered problematic because of evidence that the rings were produced simultaneously with the impact that formed the basin. The new research produced a model confirming instantaneous formation of all rings, a mechanism in which ductile subsurface rocks flowed towards the center of the basin as the crust rebounded, causing concentric cracking and slippage that formed the outer rings, and that the unstable central peak collapsing formed the inner ring.

== Examples ==
- Mare Orientale on Earth's Moon is a multi-ringed basin created by an impactor perhaps 60 kilometres (40 mi) in diameter traveling at 14 kilometres per second (9 mi/s), or about 52,100 kilometres per hour (32,400 mph)
- Anubis on Ganymede, the largest moon of Jupiter
- Valhalla on Callisto, a moon of Jupiter
- Evander on Dione, a moon of Saturn
- Caloris Basin, surrounded by Caloris Montes, on Mercury
- Burney on Pluto, a dwarf planet in the Kuiper belt

Chicxulub crater in Mexico has a sufficient area to have been a multi-ringed basin.

== See also ==
- Complex crater – Large impact craters with uplifted centres
- Impact crater – Circular depression in a solid astronomical body formed by the impact of a smaller object
- Impact event – Collision of two astronomical objects
- Impact structure – Geologic structure formed from impact on a planetary surface
- Peak ring (crater) – Roughly circular ring within an impact crater
- Pedestal crater – Type of impact carter
- Expanded crater – Type of secondary impact crater
- Traces of Catastrophe – Comprehensive technical reference on the science of impact craters book from Lunar and Planetary Institute - comprehensive reference on impact crater science
