= Acestes (crater) =

Crater on Dione, Saturn

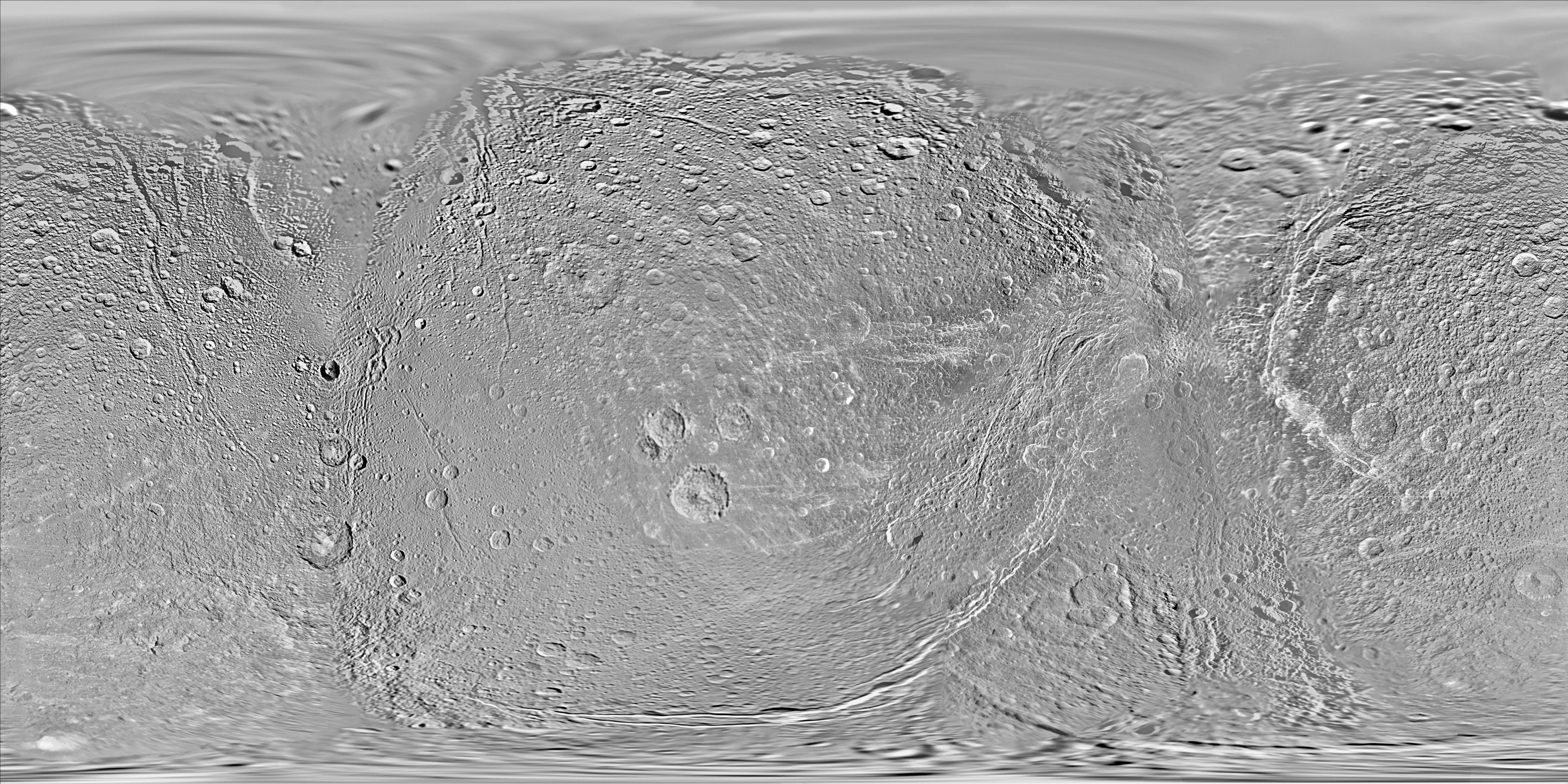
- Map of Dione; Acestes is in the northwest
- Feature type: Impact crater
- Location: Dione, Saturn
- Coordinates: 55°10′N 243°22′W
- Diameter: 108 km (67 mi)
- Discoverer: Cassini–Huygens
- Naming: 17 March 2008
- Eponym: Acestes, mythological king of Sicily; from the Aeneid by Virgil

Acestes is an impact crater on Dione, a moon of Saturn. The crater was named after Acestes, the eponymous mythological king of Sicily. Like most other craters on Dione, Acestes was named after characters in the poem, Aeneid. The name "Acestes" was officially approved by the International Astronomical Union (IAU) on 17 March 2008.

== Geology and characteristics ==
The crater is located at 55°10′N 243°22′W and probably has a rim, peak, and circular depression with a diameter of 108 kilometres (67 mi).
