= Burney (crater) =

Multi-ring impact basin on Pluto

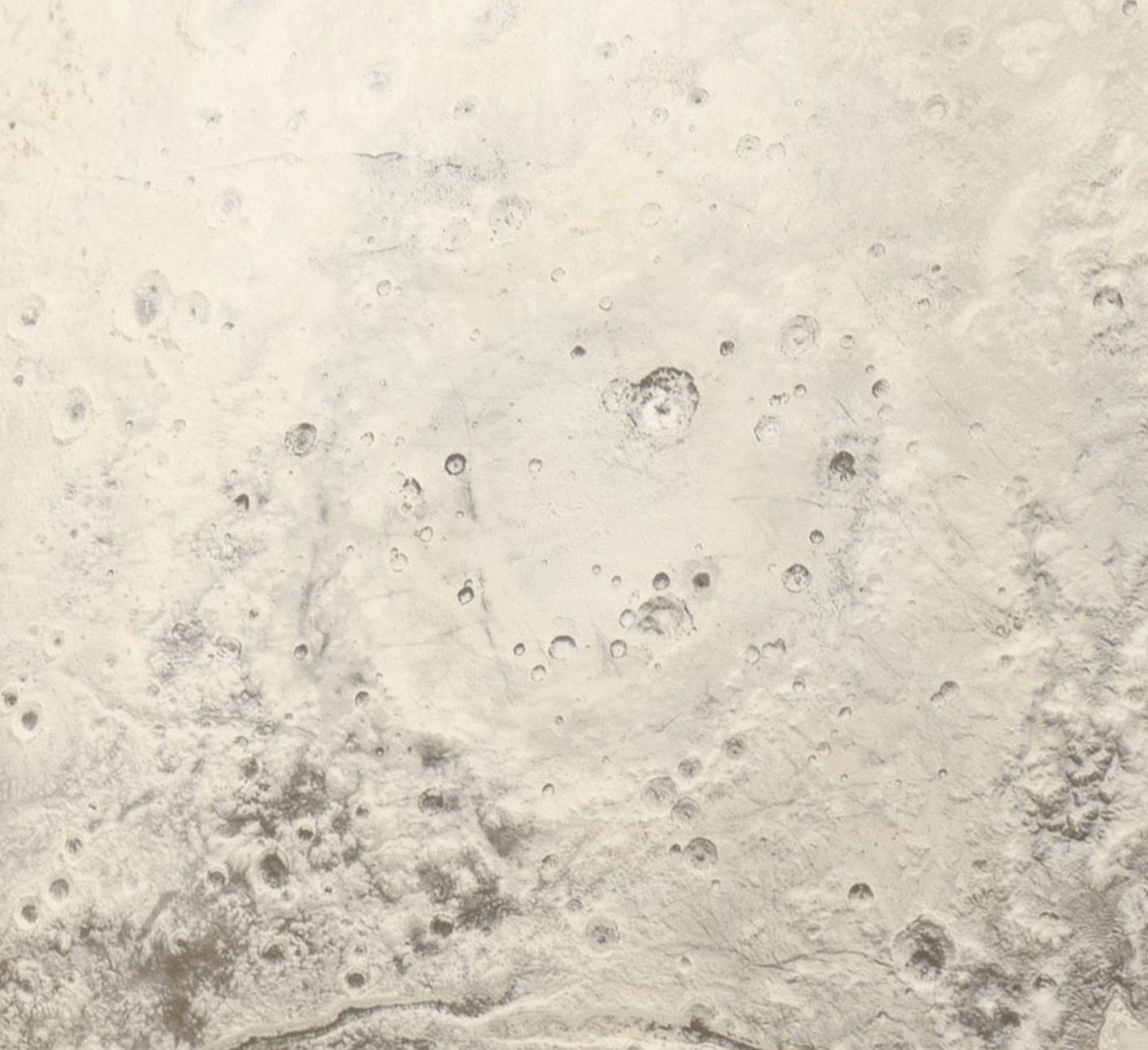
- View of Burney by New Horizons. Its heavily eroded state makes it difficult to discern; its concentric rings are only slightly brighter than the surrounding plains.
- Location: Pluto
- Coordinates: 45.68°N 133.79°E
- Diameter: 296–350 km (184–217 mi)
- Depth: 1.8–3 km (1.1–1.9 mi)
- Age: c. 4 billion years
- Discoverer: New Horizons
- Eponym: Venetia Burney

Burney is the second-largest known impact basin on the dwarf planet Pluto. With a diameter of over 290 kilometres (180 miles), it is the second-largest known impact basin on Pluto, after the Sputnik Planitia basin. Located to the northwest of Sputnik Planitia, Burney lies in heavily glaciated terrain covered in frozen nitrogen and methane. Burney is the only identified multi-ringed impact basin on Pluto, though its multiple rings have been heavily eroded due to age. (Note: Simonelli, a similarly-sized crater on the anti-encounter hemisphere of Pluto, may have multiple rings. Sputnik Planitia basin, though much larger, does not have visible rings; any structural features within its outermost rim are buried beneath its nitrogen glaciers. The blocky mountains alongside Sputnik Planitia's western border may be related to a peak ring within the basin.) It is estimated to be at least 4 billion years old, its interior marked by smaller impact craters.

== Discovery and naming ==
As with the rest of Pluto's surface features, Burney was first seen on the New Horizons flyby of Pluto and its five moons on 14 July 2015. The impact basin was informally named Burney by the New Horizons team in honor of Venetia Burney, who suggested the name Pluto to the dwarf planet's discoverer Clyde Tombaugh in 1930. The name was officially approved by the International Astronomical Union (IAU) on 8 August 2017.

== Geology ==
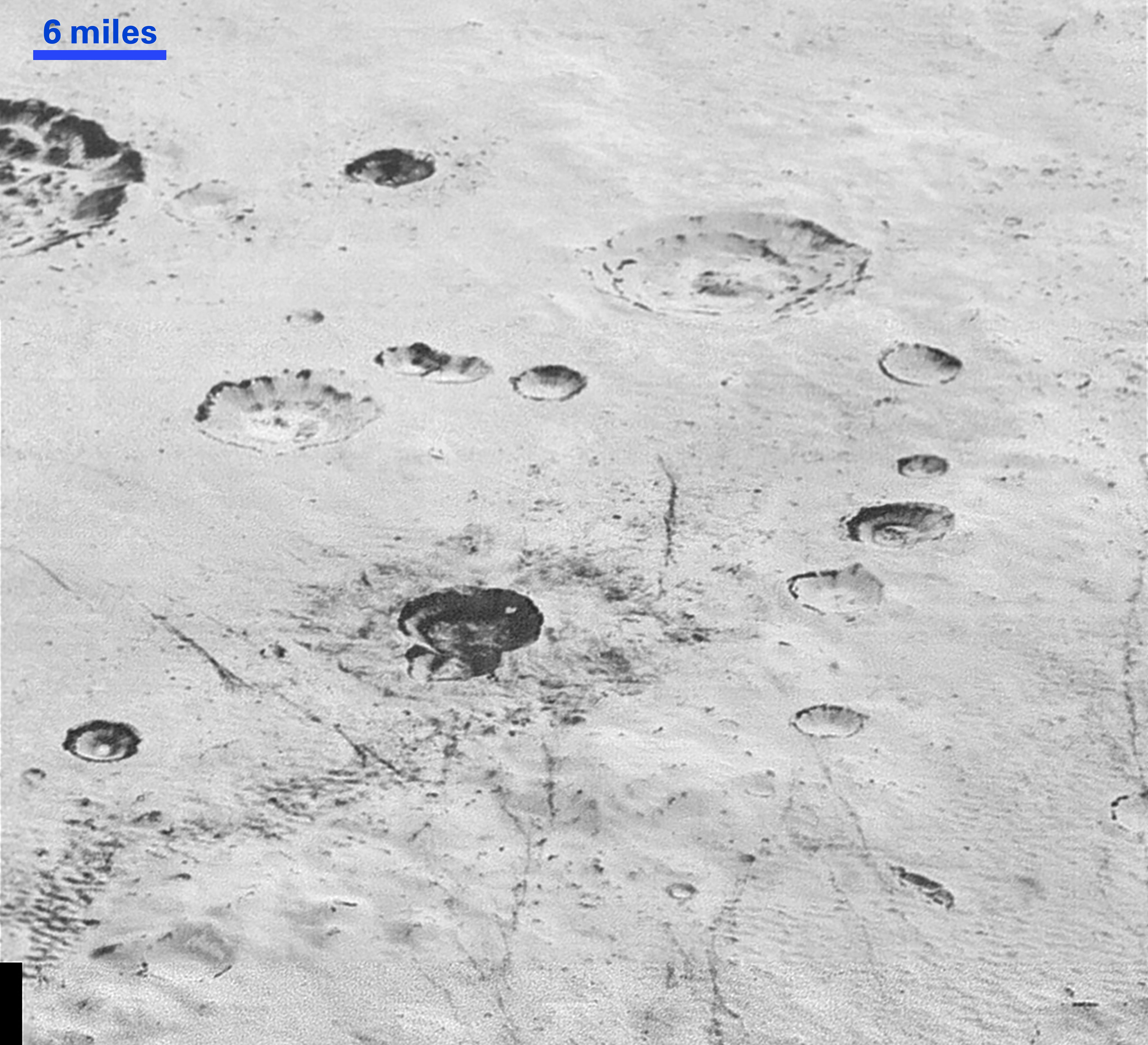
A high-resolution New Horizons image of a section of Burney and its interior craters. One of Burney's rings form a chain of mountains that arcs across the image. Scale bar of 6 mi (9.7 km) is at the top left

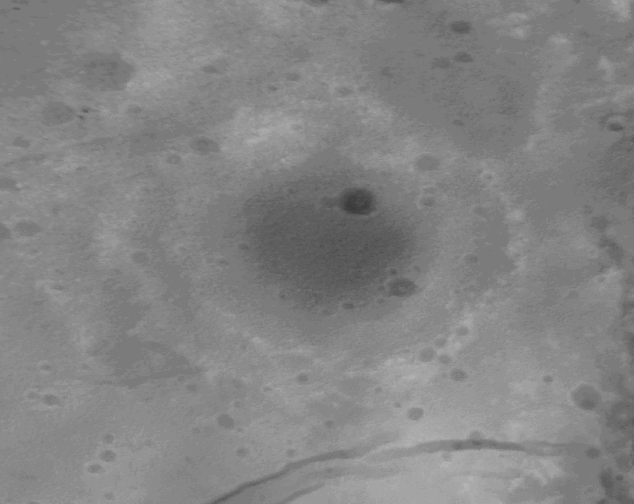
A topography map of Burney, where its multiple degraded peak rings and central depression are more apparent

Burney is the second-largest impact feature known on Pluto, after the massive basin that encloses the glacial plains of Sputnik Planitia. It is ancient, with an estimated age of at least 4 billion years old, and heavily eroded. The structure of Burney resembles that of the Mare Orientale basin on Earth's Moon and Gilgamesh on Ganymede, with a series of concentric peak rings that enclose a central depression. Burney's degraded state makes it difficult to discern its extent due to the subtle nature of its peak rings; Burney may have anywhere from 2 to 4 such rings. Estimates for Burney's diameter range from around 290 kilometres (180 miles) to around 350 kilometres (220 miles). The peak rings of Burney are discontinuous and crenulated, standing roughly 500–1,000 metres (1,600–3,300 feet) high. The central depression of Burney is approximately 180 kilometres (110 miles) across and roughly 1.8–3 kilometres (1.1–1.9 miles) deep. Within Burney are numerous smaller impact craters, one of which has been officially named Hardaway.

Much of Burney's basin floor is glaciated. Its surface is covered in bright, coarse grains of nitrogen ice mixed with water ice. Burney's peak rings are coated in methane ice, indicating that methane preferentially condenses on the high-altitude mountain peaks that comprise the concentric rings. Burney's floor is poor in methane ice and much smoother than the surrounding plains, possibly from differences in erosion or from heavier glaciation. Several dark streaks similar to those found in Sputnik Planitia were observed in and around Burney. Models of Pluto's climate indicate that Burney likely experiences downward-flowing katabatic winds.

Burney is surrounded by a broad region to the northwest of Sputnik Planitia that hosts a type of terrain informally called washboard terrain. This terrain is characterized by parallel ridges spaced 1–2 kilometres (0.62–1.24 miles) apart and covers large parts of Burney's basin floor. One hypothesis on its origin proposes that it is a field of glacial debris from an ancient period of heavy regional glaciation. The age of the washboard terrain appears to only marginally postdate the impact event that created Burney.

== See also ==
- Mare Moscoviense basin – Lunar mare on the far side of the Moon
- Dorothy – Largest crater on Charon
