= Complex crater =

Large impact craters with uplifted centres

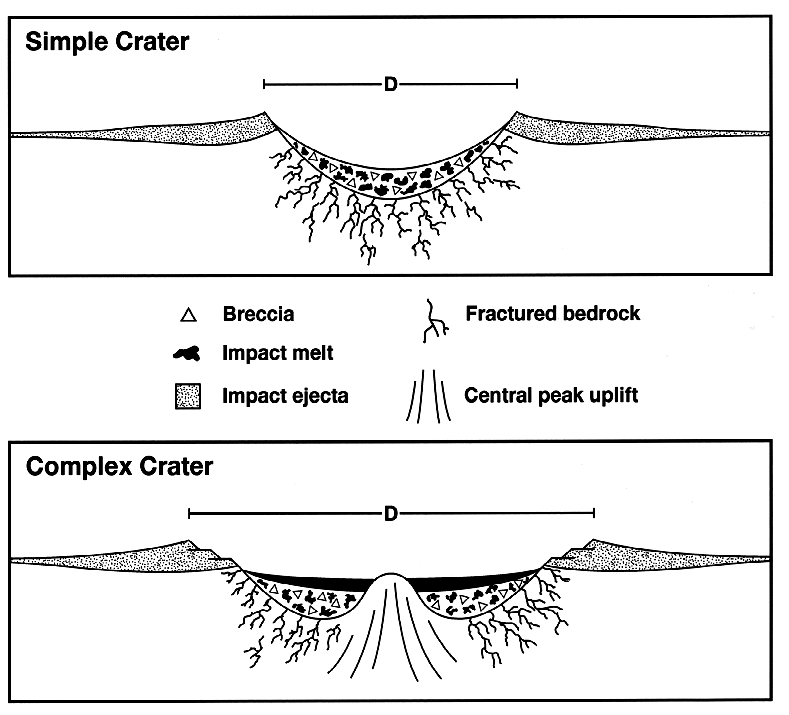
Impact crater structure

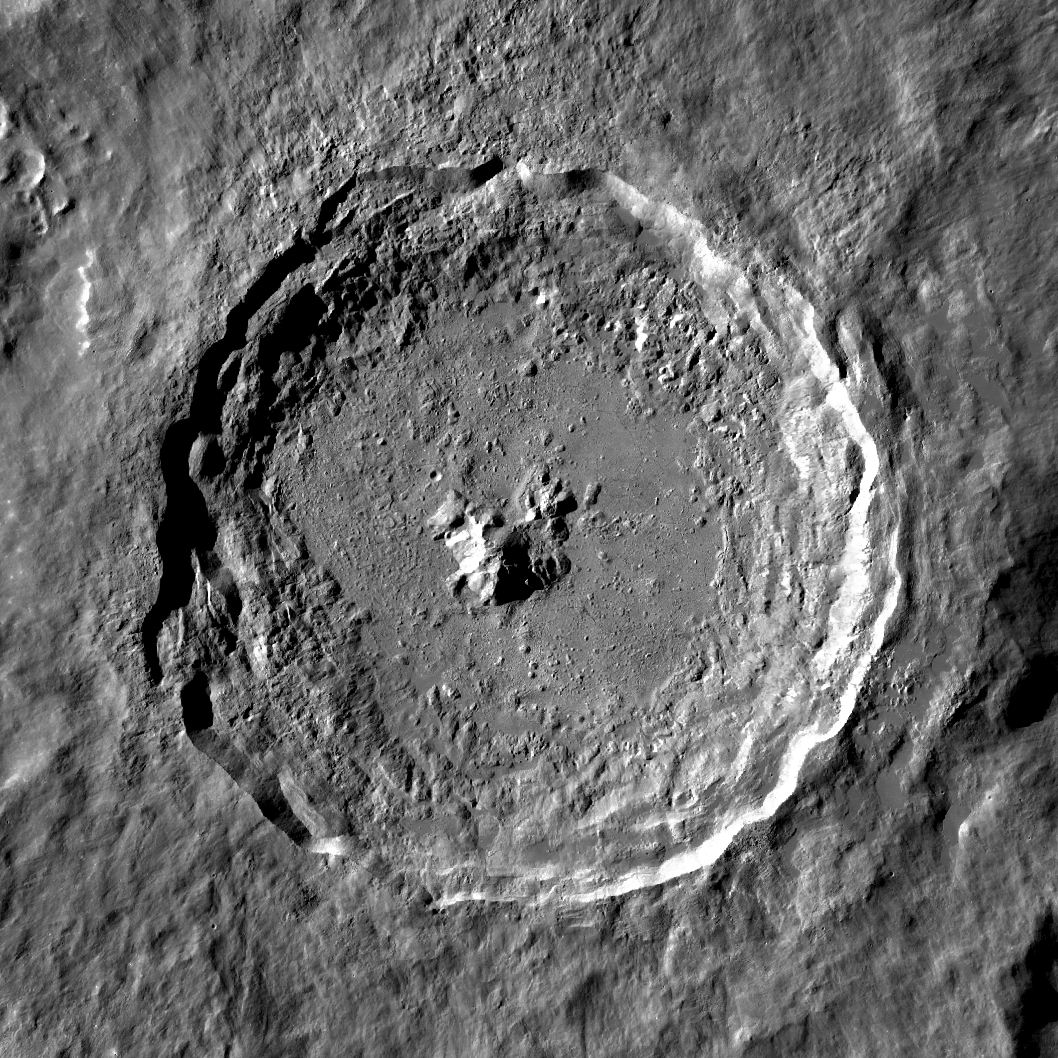
Lunar crater Tycho

Complex craters are a type of large impact crater morphology. Complex craters are classified into two groups: central-peak craters and peak-ring craters. Peak-ring craters have diameters that are larger than central-peak craters and have a ring of raised massifs which are roughly half the rim-to-rim diameter, instead of a central peak.

== Background ==
Above a certain threshold size, which varies with planetary gravity, the collapse and modification of a transient cavity is much more extensive, and the resulting structure is called a complex crater. The collapse of the transient cavity is driven by gravity, and involves both the uplift of the central region and the inward collapse of the rim. The central uplift is not the result of elastic rebound, which is a process in which a material with elastic strength attempts to return to its original geometry; rather the uplift is a process in which a material with little or no strength attempts to return to a state of gravitational equilibrium.

Complex craters have uplifted centers, and they have typically broad flat shallow crater floors, and terraced walls. At the largest sizes, one or more exterior or interior rings may appear, and the structure may be labeled an impact basin rather than an impact crater. Complex-crater morphology on rocky planets appears to follow a regular sequence with increasing size: small complex craters with a central topographic peak are called central-peak craters (e.g., Tycho); intermediate-sized craters, in which the central peak is replaced by a ring of peaks, are called peak ring craters (e.g., Schrödinger); and the largest craters contain multiple concentric topographic rings, and are called multi-ringed basins (e.g., Orientale). On icy as opposed to rocky bodies, other morphological forms appear which may have central pits rather than central peaks, and at the largest sizes may contain very many concentric rings—Valhalla on Callisto is the type example of the latter.

== Central-peak craters ==
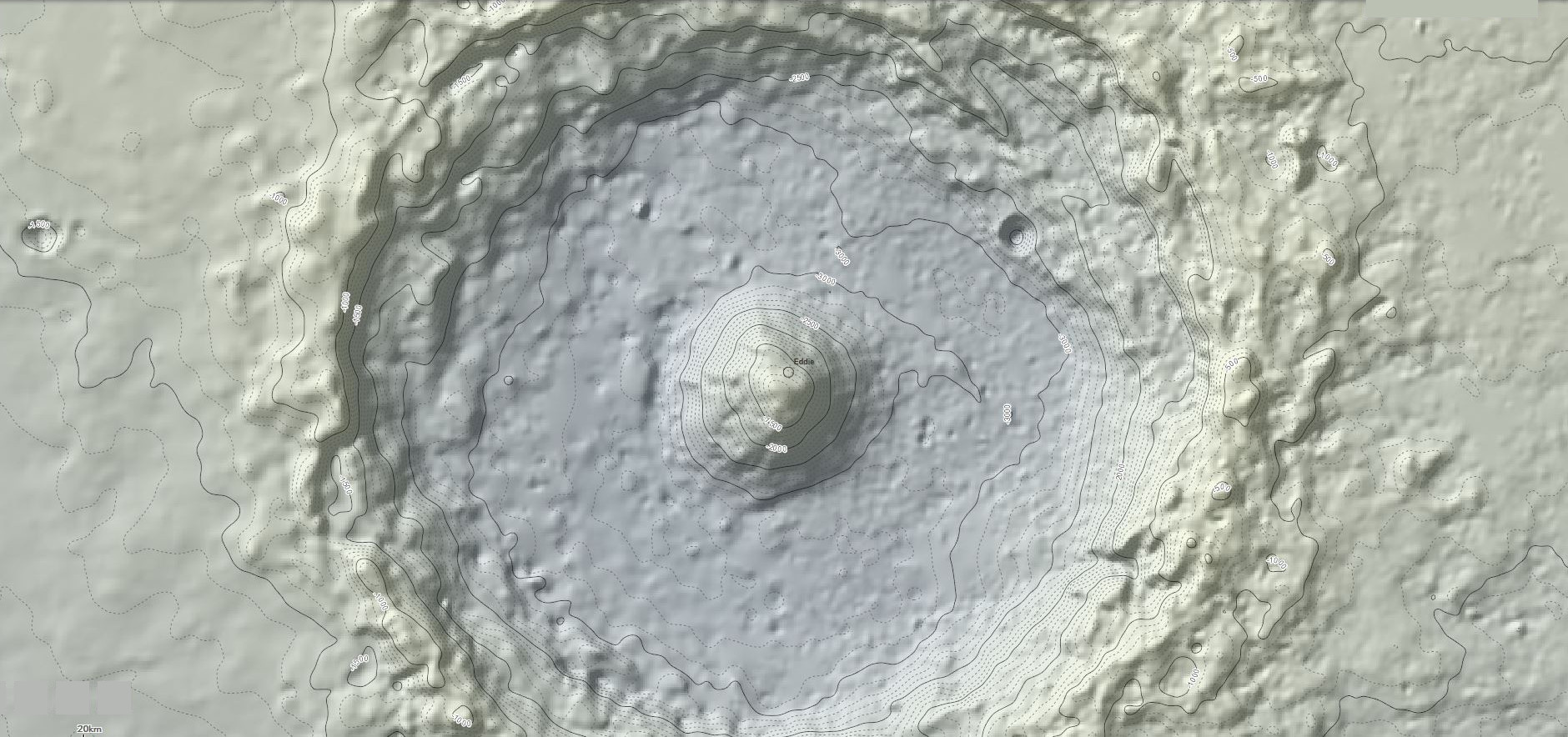
Eddie crater, a central peak-ring crater on Mars

A central-peak crater is the most basic form of complex crater. A central-peak crater can have a tightly spaced, ring-like arrangement of peaks, thus be a peak ring crater, though the peak is often single. Central-peak craters can occur in impact craters via meteorites. An Earthly example is Mistastin crater, in Canada. Many central-peak craters have rims that are scalloped, terraced inner walls, and hummocky floors.

=== When central peaks form ===
Diameters of craters where complex features form depends on the strength of gravity of the celestial body they occur on. Stronger gravity, such as on Earth compared to the Moon, causes rim collapse in smaller diameter craters. Complex craters may occur at 2 kilometres (1.2 mi) to 4 kilometres (2.5 mi) on Earth, but start from 20 kilometres (12 mi) on the Moon.

If lunar craters have diameters between about 20 kilometres (12 mi) to 175 kilometres (109 mi), the central peak is usually a single peak, or small group of peaks. Lunar craters of diameter greater than about 175 kilometres (109 mi) may have complex, ring-shaped uplifts. If impact features exceed 300 kilometres (190 mi) of diameter, they are called impact basins, not craters.

Lunar craters of 35 kilometres (22 mi) to about 170 kilometres (110 mi) in diameter possess a central peak.

There are several theories as to why central-peak craters form. Such craters are common on Earth, the Moon, Mars, and Mercury.

=== Height of central peak relative to crater diameter ===
On the Moon, heights of central peaks are directly proportional to diameters of craters, which implies that peak height varies with crater-forming energy. There is a similar relationship for terrestrial meteorite craters and TNT craters whose uplifts originated from rebound.

== See also ==
- Impact crater – Circular depression in a solid astronomical body formed by the impact of a smaller object
- Impact structure – Geologic structure formed from impact on a planetary surface
- Multi-ringed basin – Crater containing multiple concentric topographic rings
- Peak ring (crater) – Roughly circular ring within an impact crater
- Traces of Catastrophe, 1998 book from Lunar and Planetary Institute - comprehensive reference on impact crater science
