= Terraced wall =

Wall divided into sections, as in, not a single wall, that terraces

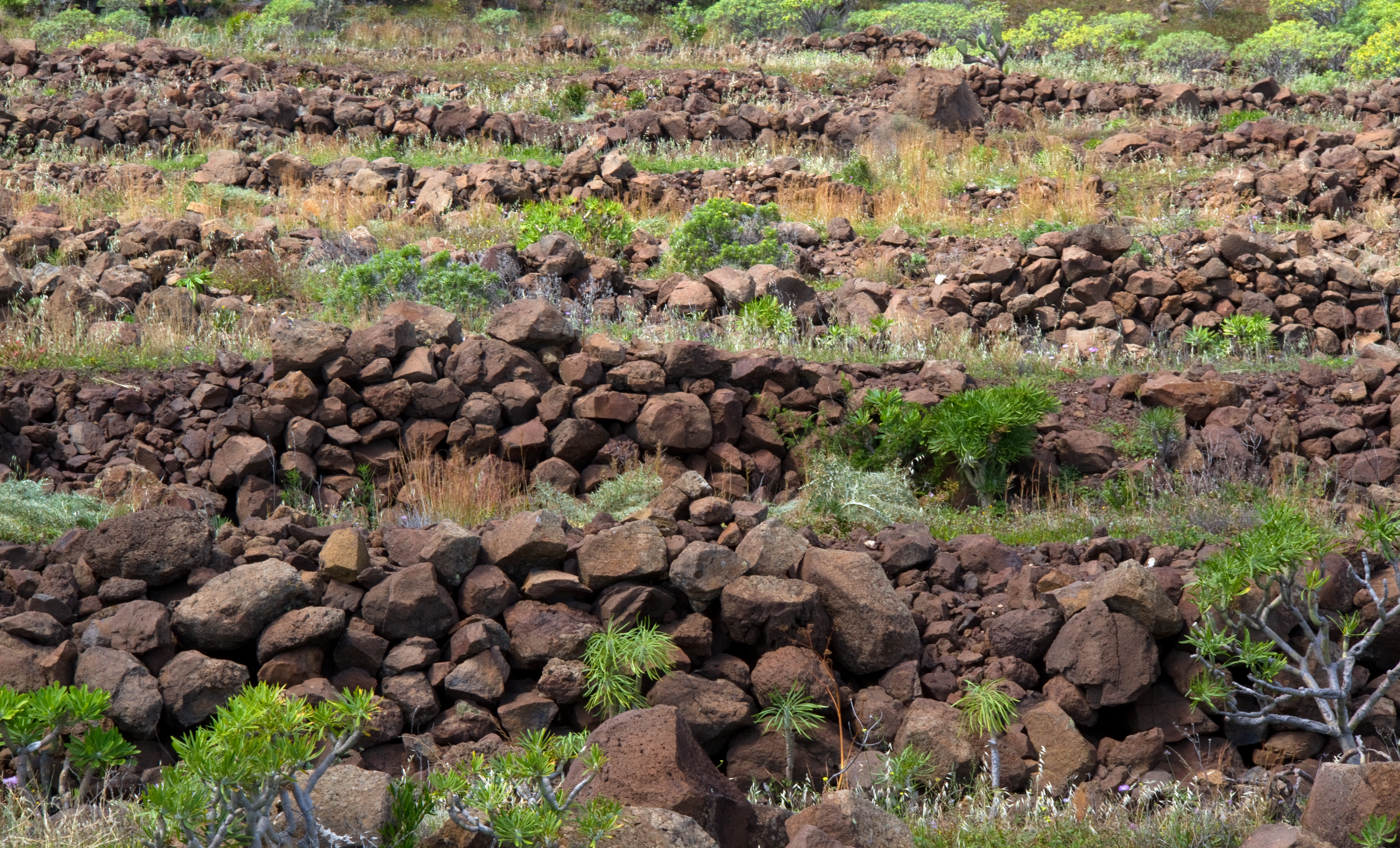
Terraced wall on La Gomera

A terraced wall, also a terrace wall, or a terraced retaining wall is a wall that is divided into sections (terraces) over a slope. Such designs are useful when building on a steep grade. Terraced walls may be built with many different materials.

Some craters have terraced walls, which includes complex craters.

== Types of terraced walls ==
A partially terraced wall is designed so that the upper terrace and lower terrace come back together, forming a taller wall. The wall may still work well, but may have aesthetic issues.

There are two types. In an independent terraced wall, the upper wall applies little or no weight load on the lower wall. In a dependent terraced wall, the upper wall places a weight load on the lower wall.

== See also ==
- Buttress
- Buttress dam
- Flying buttress
- Load-bearing wall
- Retaining wall
- Terrace (building)
- Terrace (earthworks)
- Terrace garden

== External links and references ==
- Information on building a terraced garden
- US government's NASA on a crater with a terraced wall
- A youtube, on constructing a terrace wall
- Another youtube
- A youtube, on building rock walls for garden terraces
