= Evander (crater) =

Largest impact basin on Dione

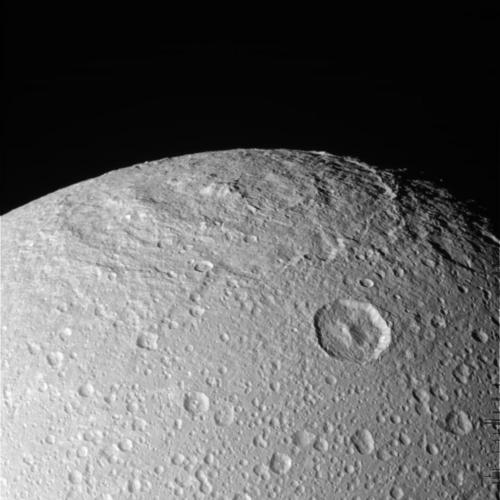
- The crater as viewed by Cassini
- Feature type: Multi-ring impact basin
- Location: Dione
- Coordinates: 57.00°S 145.00°W
- Diameter: c. 350 km
- Age: c. 1.5 billion years
- Discoverer: Cassini
- Eponym: Evander of Pallene, Roman hero

Evander is the largest impact basin on Saturn's moon Dione, located near its south polar regions. It is named after the mythological Roman hero Evander of Pallene, son of Hermes. The name "Evander" was officially approved by the International Astronomical Union (IAU) on 17 March 2008.

== Description ==
Evander is a large multi-ring impact basin located in Dione's southern hemisphere. Evander is estimated to be relatively young; estimates range from 2 billion years down to as recently as under 1 billion years old. Surrounding Evander is an extensive ejecta blanket, and a significant portion of Dione's small (< 20 km) craters may be the result of debris blasted out by the impact event that created Evander. Evander is a significantly relaxed crater, with its topographic profile having been "muted" since its formation and resulting in a shallower impact basin than would otherwise be expected. It being relaxed indicates that Dione was thermally active until recently, with a surface heat flux of over 60 mW/m^{2}.

== See also ==
- Odysseus, the largest impact basin on the neighboring moon Tethys
