= Expanded crater =

Type of secondary impact crater

An expanded crater is a type of secondary impact crater. Large impacts often create swarms of small secondary craters from the debris that is blasted out as a consequence of the impact. Studies of a type of secondary craters, called expanded craters, have given insights into places where abundant ice may be present in the ground. Expanded craters have lost their rims, this may be because any rim that was once present has collapsed into the crater during expansion or, lost its ice, if composed of ice. Excess ice (ice in addition to what is in the pores of the ground) is widespread throughout the Martian mid-latitudes, especially in Arcadia Planitia. In this region, are many expanded secondary craters that probably form from impacts that destabilize a subsurface layer of excess ice, which subsequently sublimates. With sublimation the ice changes directly from a solid to gaseous form. In the impact, the excess ice is broken up, resulting in an increase in surface area. Ice will sublimate much more if there is more surface area. After the ice disappears into the atmosphere, dry soil material will collapse and cause the crater diameter to become larger.

Since this region still has abundant expanded craters, the area between the expanded craters would have abundant ice under the surface. If all the ice was gone, all the expanded craters would also be gone. Expanded craters are more frequent in the inner layer of a type of crater called double-layer ejecta craters (formerly called rampart craters). Double layer craters are believed to form in ice-rich ground. Research, published in 2015, mapped expanded craters in Arcadia Planitia, found in the northern mid latitudes, and the research team concluded that the ice may be tens of millions of years old. The age was determined from the age of four primary craters that produced the secondary craters that later expanded when ice sublimated. The craters were Steinheim, Gan, Domoni, and an unnamed crater with a diameter of 6 km. Based on measurements and models, the researchers calculated that at least 6000 Km3 of ice is still preserved in non-cratered portions of Arcadia Planitia. Places on Mars that display expanded craters may indicate where future colonists can find water ice.

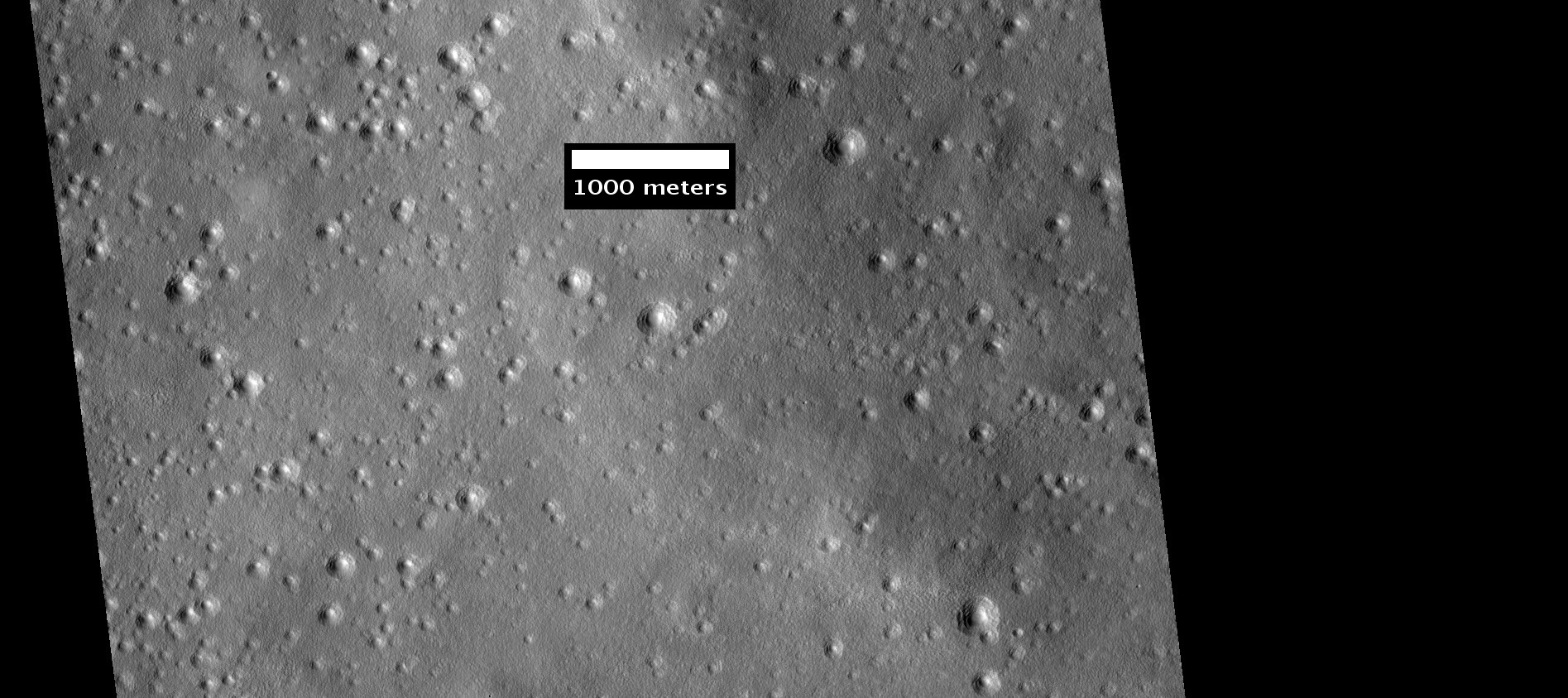
Wide view of expanded craters, as seen by HiRISE After the impact, ice left the ground and made the crater larger in diameter.

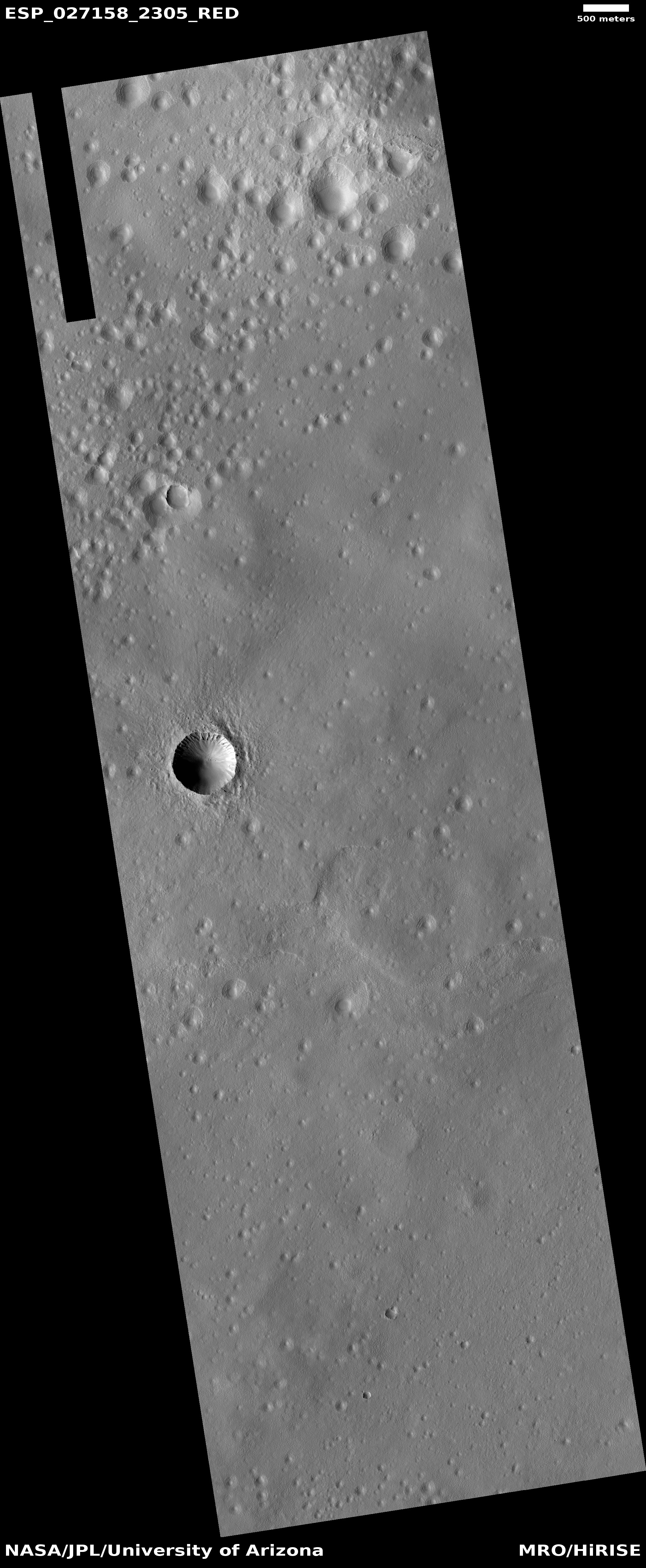
Wide view of expanded craters, as seen by HiRISE After the impact, ice left the ground and made the crater larger in diameter.

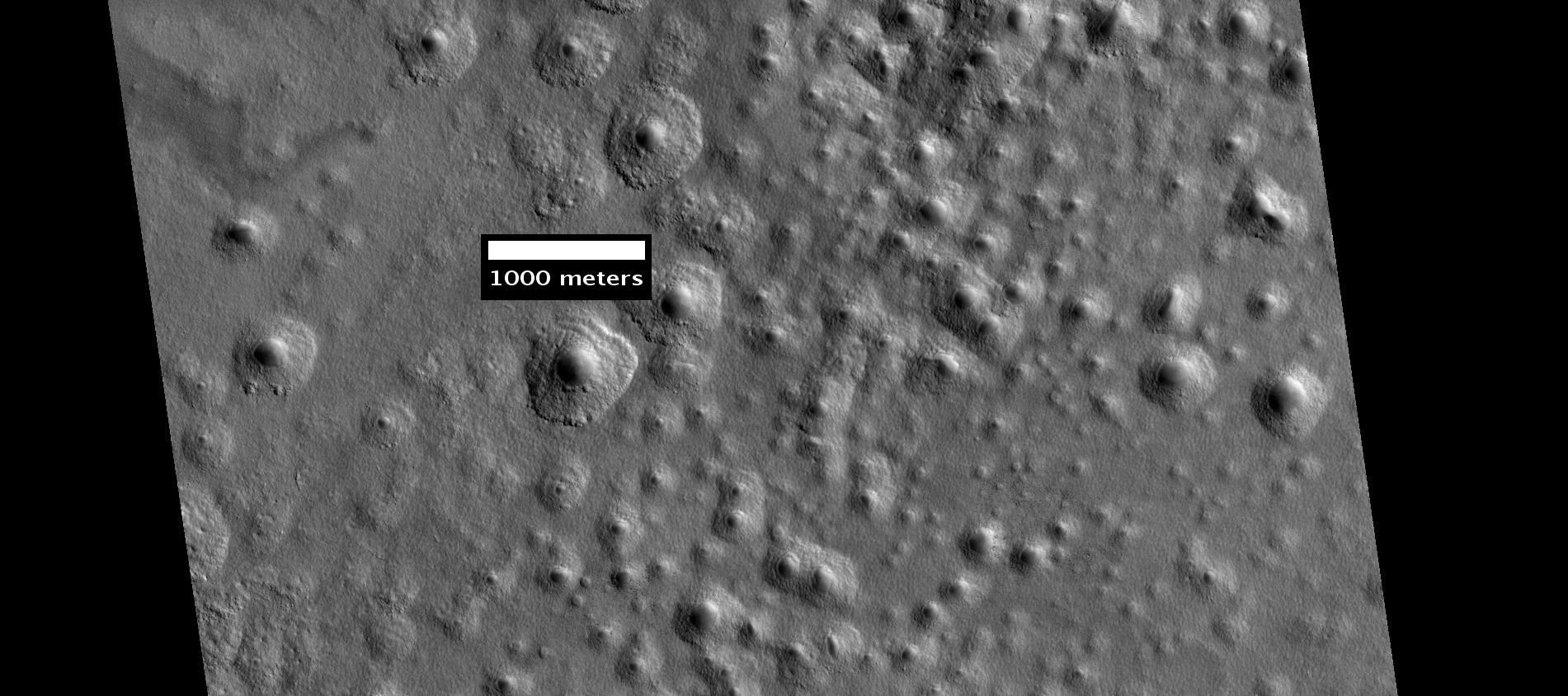
Close view of expanded craters, as seen by HiRISE After the impact, ice left the ground and made the crater larger in diameter.

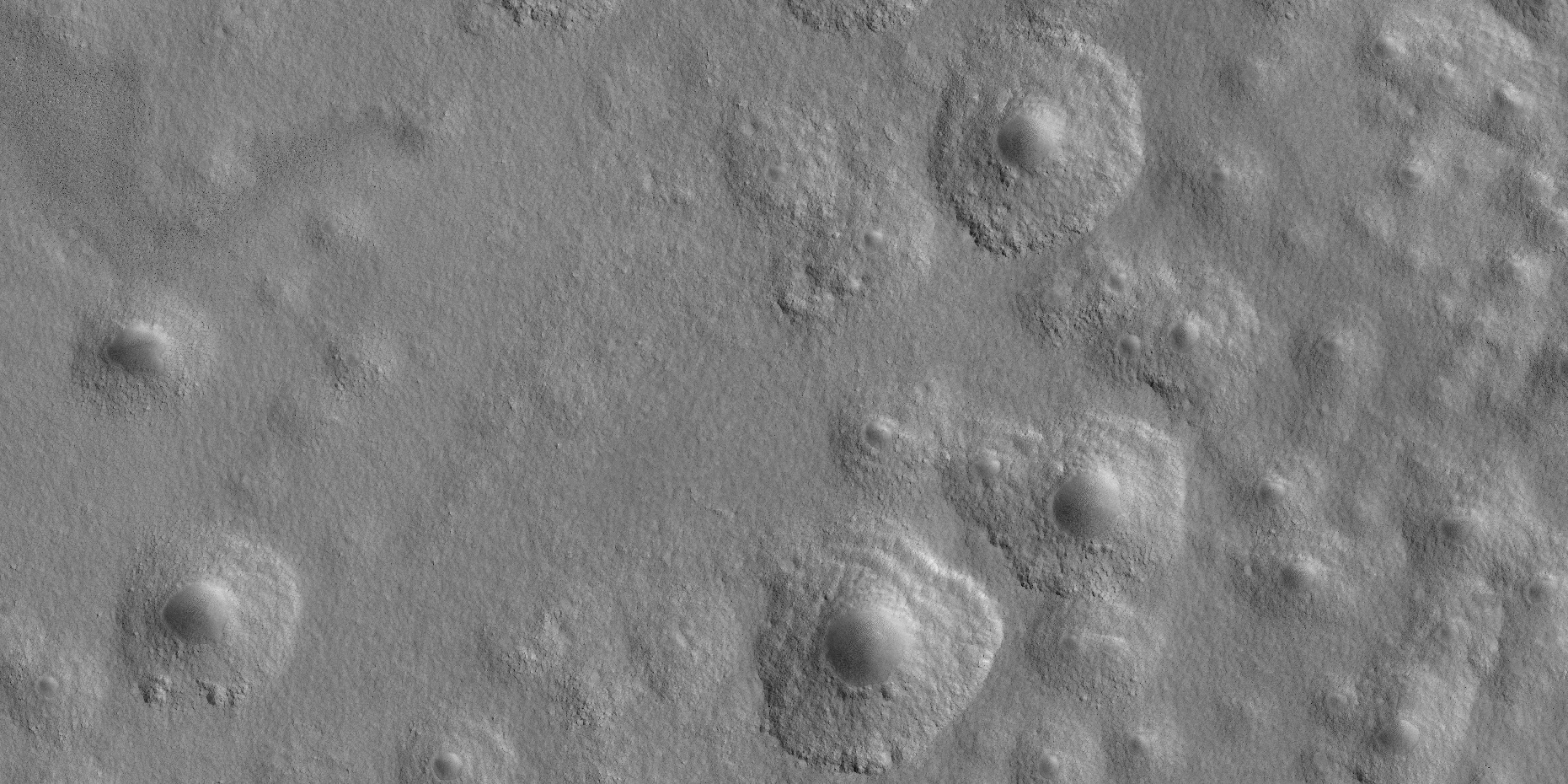
Close view of expanded craters, as seen by HiRISE After the impact, ice left the ground and made the crater larger in diameter.

== See also ==
- Diacria quadrangle
