= Impact crater =

Circular depression in a solid astronomical body formed by the impact of a smaller object

Impact craters in the Solar System

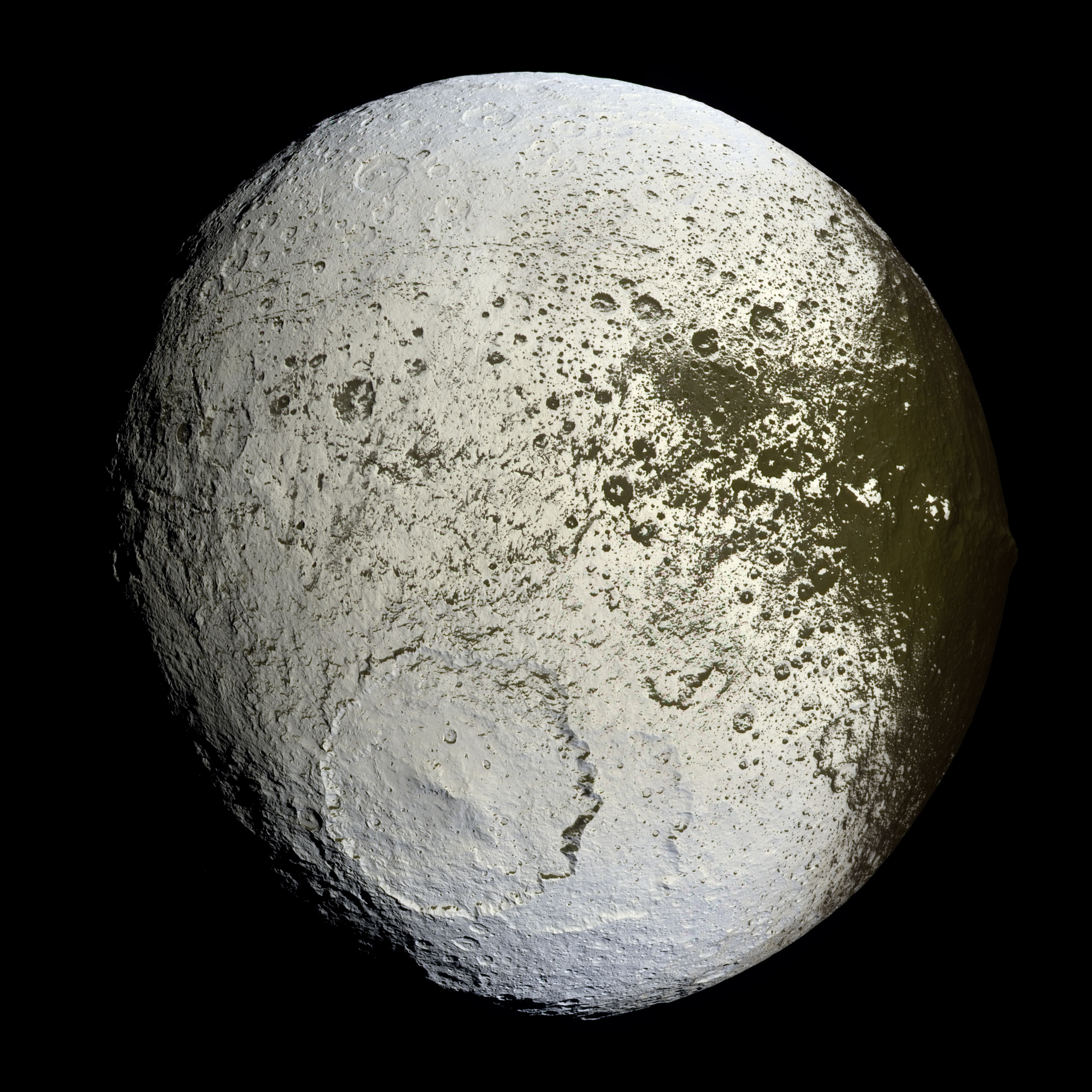
500-kilometre-wide (310 mi) crater Engelier on Saturn's moon Iapetus

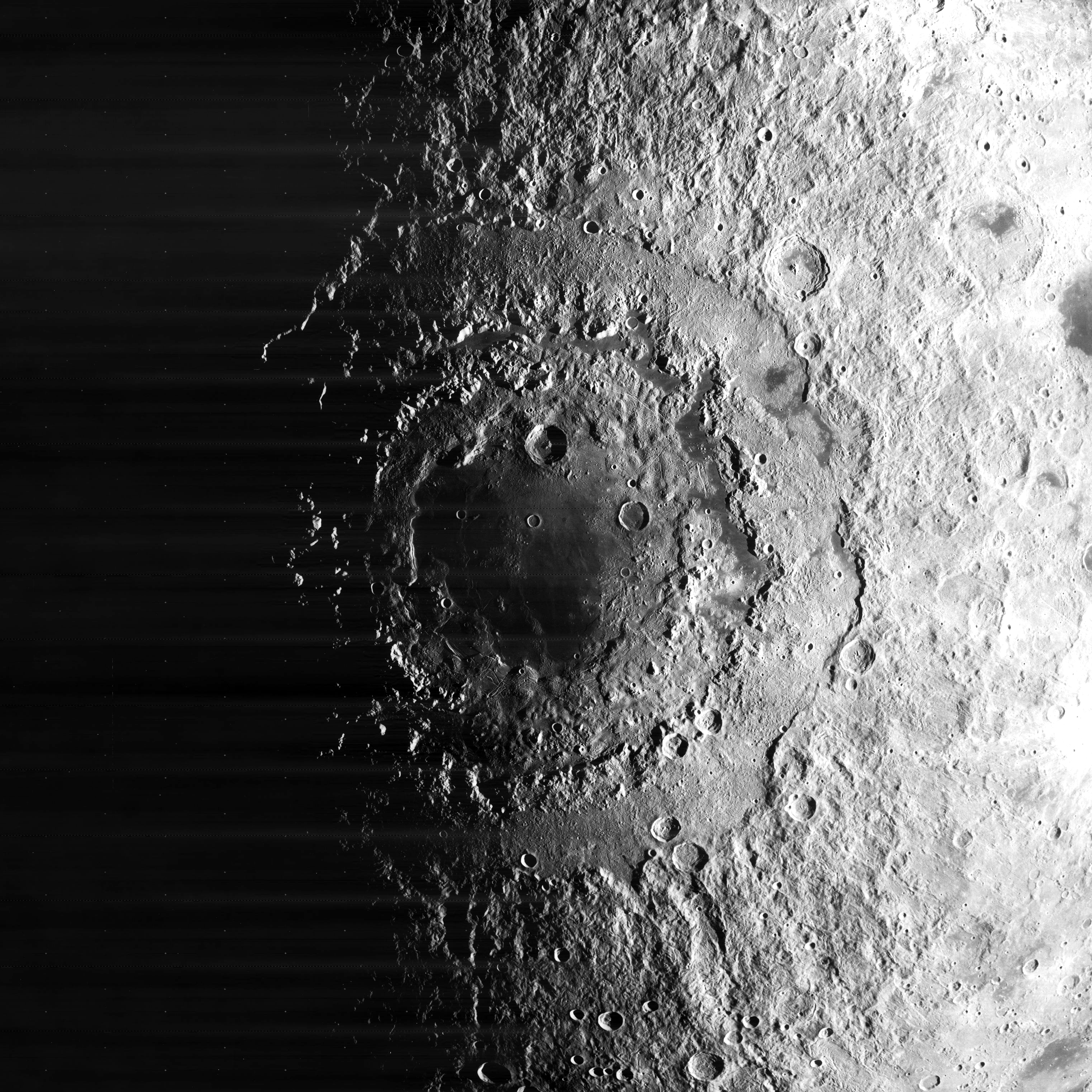
Mare Orientale on the Moon, a prominent well-structured example of a multi-ring basin

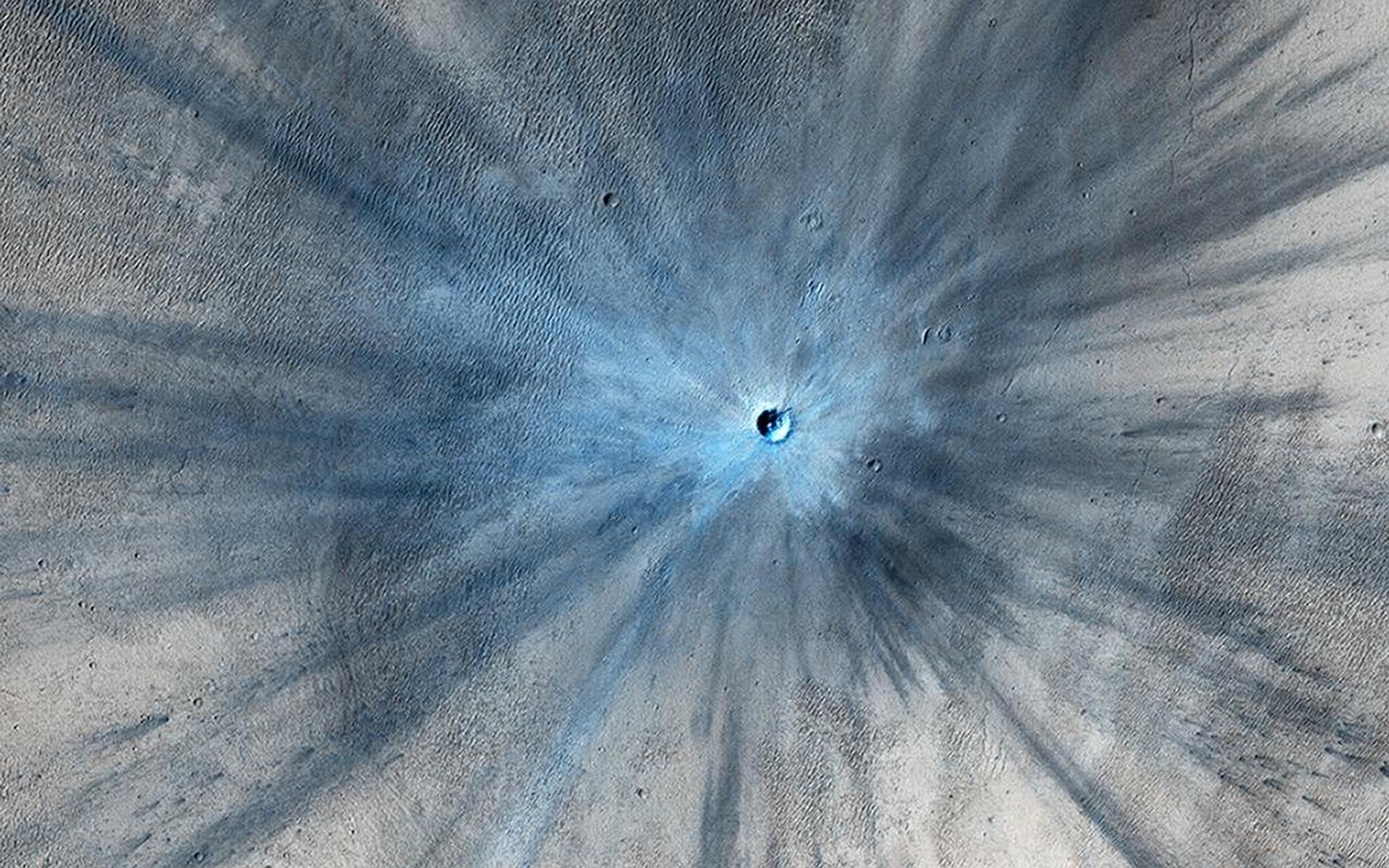
Recently formed (between July 2010 and May 2012) impact crater on Mars showing a pristine ray system of ejecta

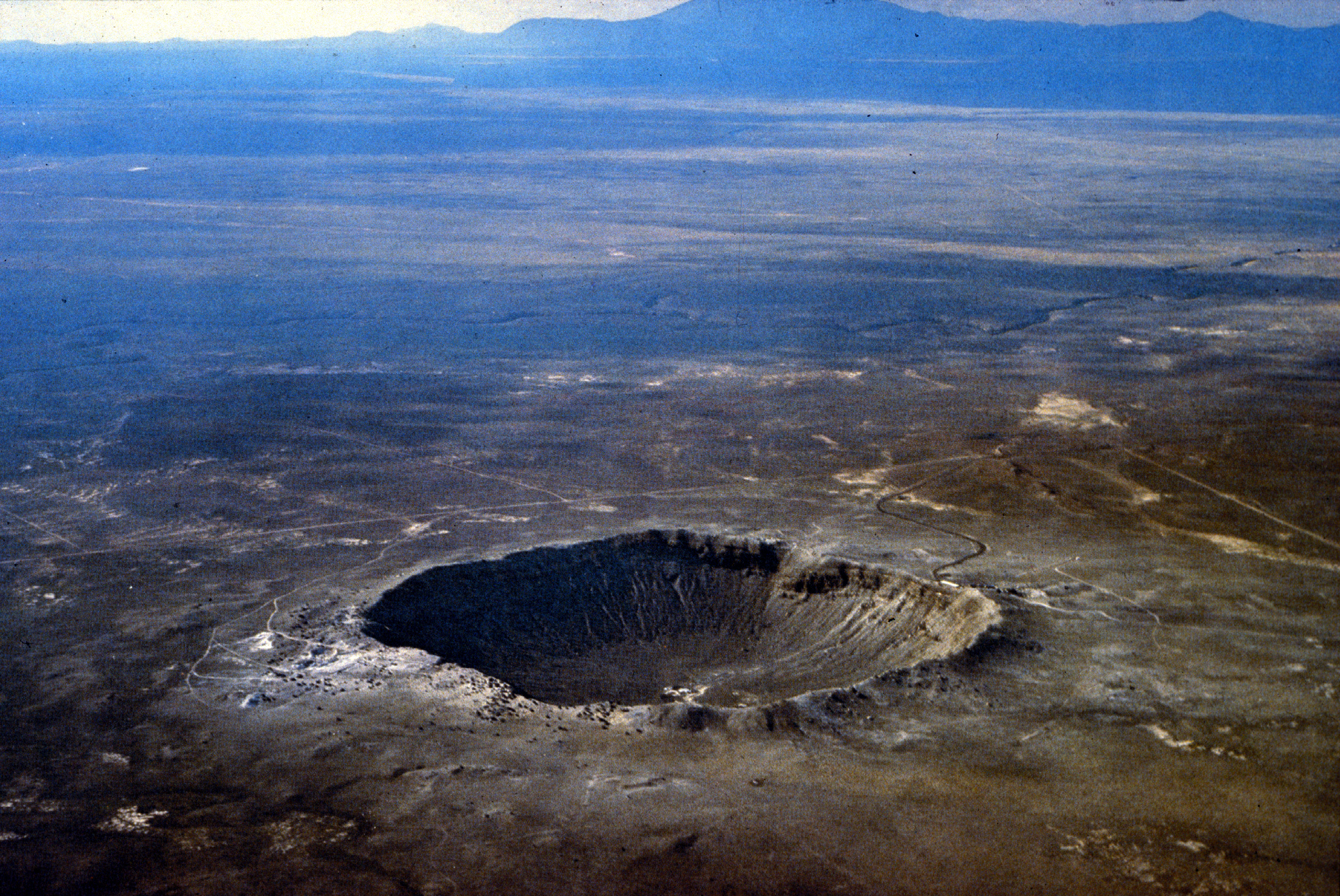
50,000-year-old Meteor Crater east of Flagstaff, Arizona, U.S. on Earth

An impact crater is a depression in the surface of a solid astronomical body formed by the hypervelocity impact of a smaller object. In contrast to volcanic craters, which result from explosion or internal collapse, impact craters typically have raised rims and floors that are lower in elevation than the surrounding terrain. Impact craters are typically circular, though they can be elliptical in shape or even irregular due to events such as landslides. Impact craters range in size from microscopic craters seen on lunar rocks returned by the Apollo Program to simple bowl-shaped depressions and vast, complex, multi-ringed impact basins. Meteor Crater is a well-known example of a small impact crater on Earth.

Impact craters are the dominant geographic features on many solid Solar System objects including the Moon, Mercury, Callisto, Ganymede, and most small moons and asteroids. On other planets and moons that experience more active surface geological processes, such as Earth, Venus, Europa, Io, Titan, and Triton, visible impact craters are less common because they become eroded, buried, or transformed by tectonic and volcanic processes over time. Where such processes have destroyed most of the original crater topography, the terms impact structure or astrobleme are more commonly used. In early literature, before the significance of impact cratering was widely recognised, the terms cryptoexplosion or cryptovolcanic structure were often used to describe what are now recognised as impact-related features on Earth.

The cratering records of very old surfaces, such as Mercury, the Moon, and the southern highlands of Mars, record a period of intense early bombardment in the inner Solar System around 3.9 billion years ago. The rate of crater production on Earth has since been considerably lower, but it is appreciable nonetheless. Earth experiences, on average, from one to three impacts large enough to produce a 20-kilometre-diameter (12 mi) crater every million years. This indicates that there should be far more relatively young craters on the planet than have been discovered so far. The cratering rate in the inner solar system fluctuates as a consequence of collisions in the asteroid belt that create a family of fragments that are often sent cascading into the inner solar system. Formed in a collision 80 million years ago, the Baptistina family of asteroids is thought to have caused a large spike in the impact rate. The rate of impact cratering in the outer Solar System could be different from the inner Solar System.

Although Earth's active surface processes quickly destroy the impact record, about 190 terrestrial impact craters have been identified. These range in diameter from a few tens of meters up to about 300 km (190 mi), and they range in age from recent times (e.g. the Sikhote-Alin craters in Russia whose creation was witnessed in 1947) to more than two billion years, though most are less than 500 million years old because geological processes tend to obliterate older craters. They are also selectively found in the stable interior regions of continents. Few undersea craters have been discovered because of the difficulty of surveying the sea floor, the rapid rate of change of the ocean bottom, and the subduction of the ocean floor into Earth's interior by processes of plate tectonics.

== History ==
Daniel M. Barringer, a mining engineer, was convinced already in 1903 that the crater he owned, Meteor Crater, was of cosmic origin. Most geologists at the time assumed it formed as the result of a volcanic steam eruption.

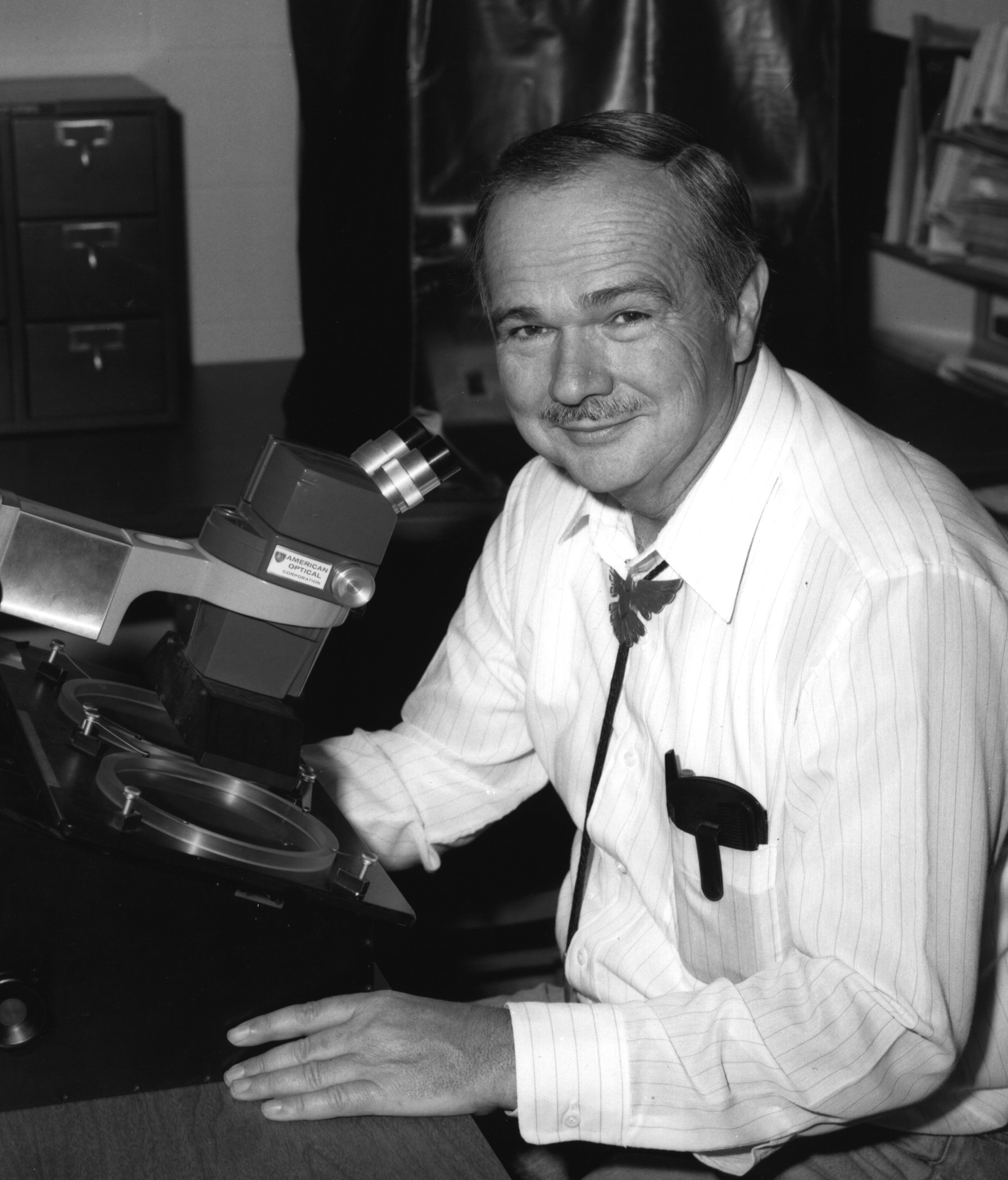
Eugene Shoemaker, pioneer impact crater researcher, here at a crystallographic microscope used to examine meteorites

In the 1920s, the American geologist Walter H. Bucher studied a number of sites now recognized as impact craters in the United States. He concluded they had been created by some great explosive event, but believed that this force was probably volcanic in origin. However, in 1936, the geologists John D. Boon and Claude C. Albritton Jr. revisited Bucher's studies and concluded that the craters that he studied were probably formed by impacts.

Grove Karl Gilbert suggested in 1893 that the Moon's craters were formed by large asteroid impacts. Ralph Baldwin in 1949 wrote that the Moon's craters were mostly of impact origin. Around 1960, Gene Shoemaker revived the idea. According to David H. Levy, Shoemaker "saw the craters on the Moon as logical impact sites that were formed not gradually, in eons, but explosively, in seconds." For his PhD degree at Princeton University (1960), under the guidance of Harry Hammond Hess, Shoemaker studied the impact dynamics of Meteor Crater. Shoemaker noted that Meteor Crater had the same form and structure as two explosion craters created from atomic bomb tests at the Nevada Test Site, notably Jangle U in 1951 and Teapot Ess in 1955. In 1960, Edward C. T. Chao and Shoemaker identified coesite (a form of silicon dioxide) at Meteor Crater, proving the crater was formed from an impact generating extremely high temperatures and pressures. They followed this discovery with the identification of coesite within suevite at Nördlinger Ries, proving its impact origin.

Armed with the knowledge of shock-metamorphic features, Carlyle S. Beals and colleagues at the Dominion Astrophysical Observatory in Victoria, British Columbia, Canada and Wolf von Engelhardt of the University of Tübingen in Germany began a methodical search for impact craters. By 1970, they had tentatively identified more than 50. Although their work was controversial, the American Apollo Moon landings, which were in progress at the time, provided supportive evidence by recognizing the rate of impact cratering on the Moon. Because the processes of erosion on the Moon are minimal, craters persist. Since the Earth could be expected to have roughly the same cratering rate as the Moon, it became clear that the Earth had suffered far more impacts than could be seen by counting evident craters.

== Crater formation ==
A laboratory simulation of an impact event and crater formation

Impact cratering involves high velocity collisions between solid objects, typically much greater than the speed of sound in those objects. Such hyper-velocity impacts produce physical effects such as melting and vaporization that do not occur in familiar sub-sonic collisions. On Earth, ignoring the slowing effects of travel through the atmosphere, the lowest impact velocity with an object from space is equal to the gravitational escape velocity of about 11 km/s. The fastest impacts occur at about 72 km/s in the "worst case" scenario in which an object in a retrograde near-parabolic orbit hits Earth. The median impact velocity on Earth is about 20 km/s.

However, the slowing effects of travel through the atmosphere rapidly decelerate any potential impactor, especially in the lowest 12 kilometres where 90% of the Earth's atmospheric mass lies. Meteors of up to 7,000 kg lose all their cosmic velocity due to atmospheric drag at a certain altitude (retardation point), and start to accelerate again due to Earth's gravity until the body reaches its terminal velocity of 0.09 to 0.16 km/s. The larger the meteoroid (i.e. asteroids and comets) the more of its initial cosmic velocity it preserves. While an object of 9,000 kg maintains about 6% of its original velocity, one of 900,000 kg already preserves about 70%. Extremely large bodies (about 100,000 tonnes) are not slowed by the atmosphere at all, and impact with their initial cosmic velocity if no prior disintegration occurs.

Impacts at these high speeds produce shock waves in solid materials, and both impactor and the material impacted are rapidly compressed to high density. Following initial compression, the high-density, over-compressed region rapidly depressurizes, exploding violently, to set in train the sequence of events that produces the impact crater. Impact-crater formation is therefore more closely analogous to cratering by high explosives than by mechanical displacement. Indeed, the energy density of some material involved in the formation of impact craters is many times higher than that generated by high explosives. Since craters are caused by explosions, they are nearly always circular – only very low-angle impacts cause significantly elliptical craters.

This describes impacts on solid surfaces. Impacts on porous surfaces, such as that of Hyperion, may produce internal compression without ejecta, punching a hole in the surface without filling in nearby craters. This may explain the 'sponge-like' appearance of that moon.

It is convenient to divide the impact process conceptually into three distinct stages: (1) initial contact and compression, (2) excavation, (3) modification and collapse. In practice, there is overlap between the three processes with, for example, the excavation of the crater continuing in some regions while modification and collapse is already underway in others.

=== Contact and compression ===
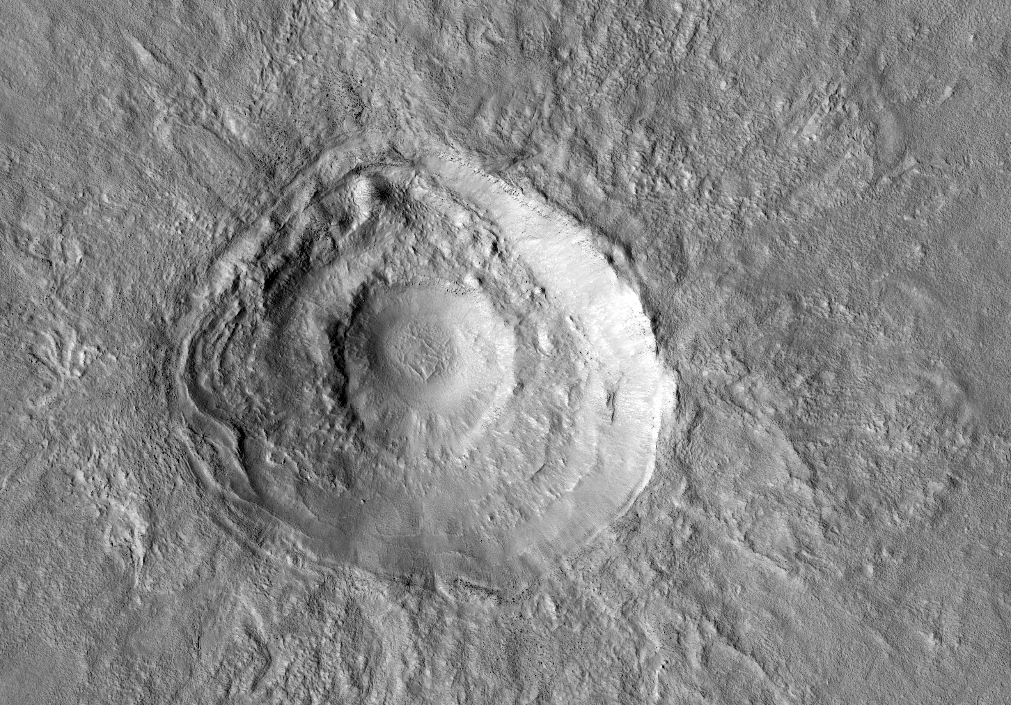
Nested Craters on Mars, 40.104° N, 125.005° E. These nested craters are probably caused by changes in the strength of the target material. This usually happens when a weaker material overlies a stronger material.

In the absence of atmosphere, the impact process begins when the impactor first touches the target surface. This contact accelerates the target and decelerates the impactor. Because the impactor is moving so rapidly, the rear of the object moves a significant distance during the short-but-finite time taken for the deceleration to propagate across the impactor. As a result, the impactor is compressed, its density rises, and the pressure within it increases dramatically. Peak pressures in large impacts exceed 1 terapascal to reach values more usually found deep in the interiors of planets, or generated artificially in nuclear explosions.

In physical terms, a shock wave originates from the point of contact. As this shock wave expands, it decelerates and compresses the impactor, and it accelerates and compresses the target. Stress levels within the shock wave far exceed the strength of solid materials; consequently, both the impactor and the target close to the impact site are irreversibly damaged. Many crystalline minerals can be transformed into higher-density phases by shock waves; for example, the common mineral quartz can be transformed into the higher-pressure forms coesite and stishovite. Many other shock-related changes take place within both impactor and target as the shock wave passes through, and some of these changes can be used as diagnostic tools to determine whether particular geological features were produced by impact cratering.

As the shock wave decays, the shocked region decompresses towards more usual pressures and densities. The damage produced by the shock wave raises the temperature of the material. In all but the smallest impacts this increase in temperature is sufficient to melt the impactor, and in larger impacts to vaporize most of it and to melt large volumes of the target. As well as being heated, the target near the impact is accelerated by the shock wave, and it continues moving away from the impact behind the decaying shock wave.

=== Excavation ===
Contact, compression, decompression, and the passage of the shock wave all occur within a few tenths of a second for a large impact. The subsequent excavation of the crater occurs more slowly, and during this stage the flow of material is largely subsonic. During excavation, the crater grows as the accelerated target material moves away from the point of impact. The target's motion is initially downwards and outwards, but it becomes outwards and upwards. The flow initially produces an approximately hemispherical cavity that continues to grow, eventually producing a paraboloid (bowl-shaped) crater in which the centre has been pushed down, a significant volume of material has been ejected, and a topographically elevated crater rim has been pushed up. When this cavity has reached its maximum size, it is called the transient cavity.

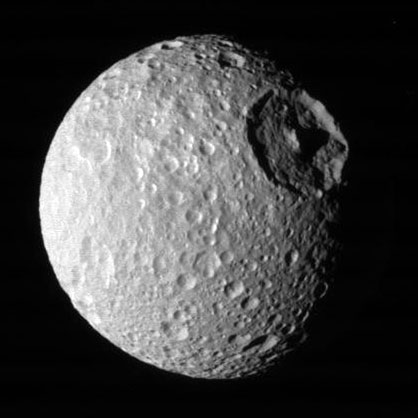
Herschel Crater on Saturn's moon Mimas

The depth of the transient cavity is typically a quarter to a third of its diameter. Ejecta thrown out of the crater do not include material excavated from the full depth of the transient cavity; typically the depth of maximum excavation is only about a third of the total depth. As a result, about one third of the volume of the transient crater is formed by the ejection of material, and the remaining two thirds is formed by the displacement of material downwards, outwards and upwards, to form the elevated rim. For impacts into highly porous materials, a significant crater volume may also be formed by the permanent compaction of the pore space. Such compaction craters may be important on many asteroids, comets and small moons.

In large impacts, as well as material displaced and ejected to form the crater, significant volumes of target material may be melted and vaporized together with the original impactor. Some of this impact melt rock may be ejected, but most of it remains within the transient crater, initially forming a layer of impact melt coating the interior of the transient cavity. In contrast, the hot dense vaporized material expands rapidly out of the growing cavity, carrying some solid and molten material within it as it does so. As this hot vapor cloud expands, it rises and cools much like the archetypal mushroom cloud generated by large nuclear explosions. In large impacts, the expanding vapor cloud may rise to many times the scale height of the atmosphere, effectively expanding into free space.

Most material ejected from the crater is deposited within a few crater radii, but a small fraction may travel large distances at high velocity, and in large impacts it may exceed escape velocity and leave the impacted planet or moon entirely. The majority of the fastest material is ejected from close to the center of impact, and the slowest material is ejected close to the rim at low velocities to form an overturned coherent flap of ejecta immediately outside the rim. As ejecta escapes from the growing crater, it forms an expanding curtain in the shape of an inverted cone. The trajectory of individual particles within the curtain is thought to be largely ballistic.

Small volumes of un-melted and relatively un-shocked material may be spalled at very high relative velocities from the surface of the target and from the rear of the impactor. Spalling provides a potential mechanism whereby material may be ejected into inter-planetary space largely undamaged, and whereby small volumes of the impactor may be preserved undamaged even in large impacts. Small volumes of high-speed material may also be generated early in the impact by jetting. This occurs when two surfaces converge rapidly and obliquely at a small angle, and high-temperature highly shocked material is expelled from the convergence zone with velocities that may be several times larger than the impact velocity.

=== Modification and collapse ===
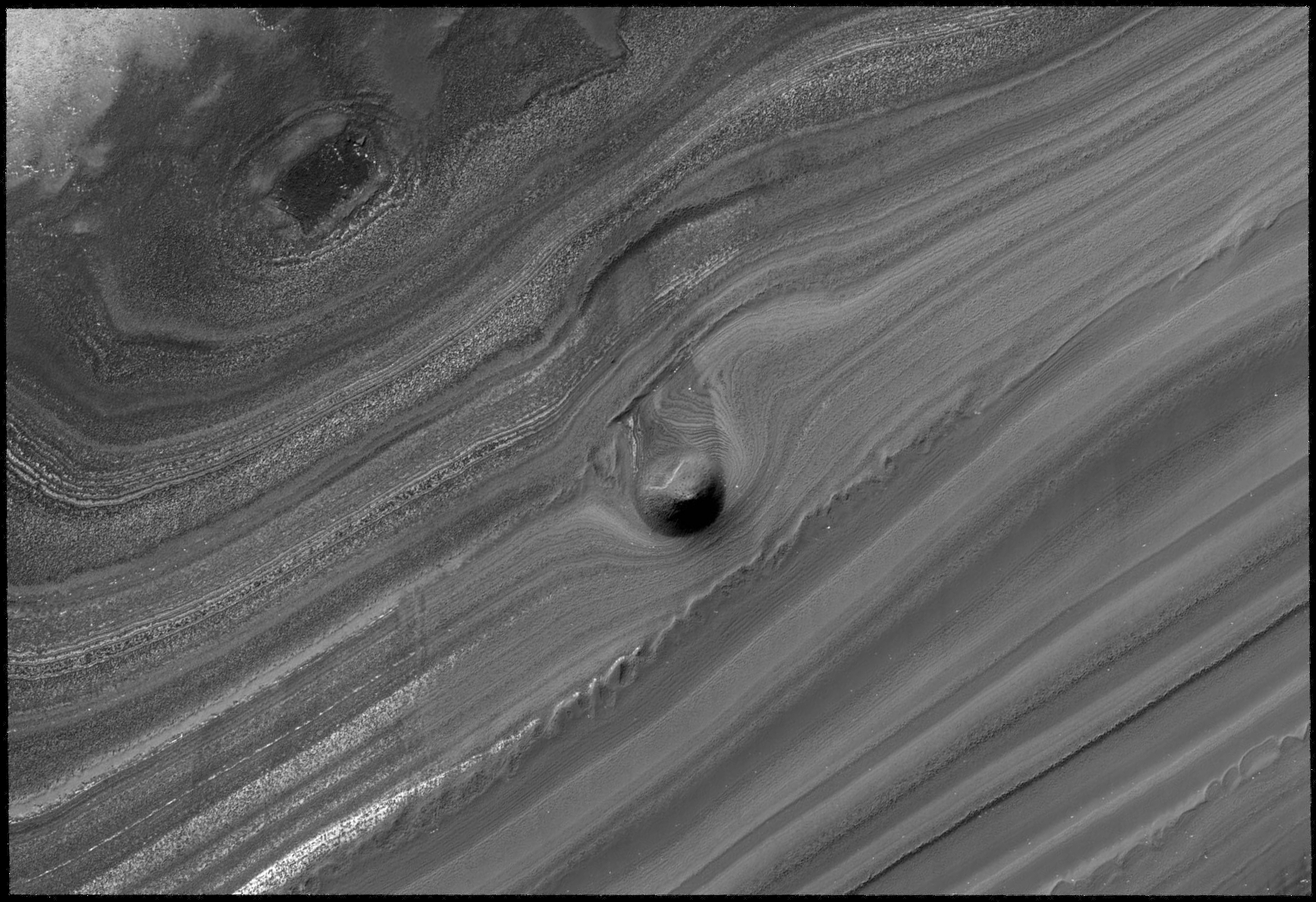
Weathering may change the aspect of a crater drastically. This mound on Mars' north pole may be the result of an impact crater that was buried by sediment and subsequently re-exposed by erosion.

In most circumstances, the transient cavity is not stable and collapses under gravity. In small craters, less than about 4 km diameter on Earth, there is some limited collapse of the crater rim coupled with debris sliding down the crater walls and drainage of impact melts into the deeper cavity. The resultant structure is called a simple crater, and it remains bowl-shaped and superficially similar to the transient crater. In simple craters, the original excavation cavity is overlain by a lens of collapse breccia, ejecta and melt rock, and a portion of the central crater floor may sometimes be flat.

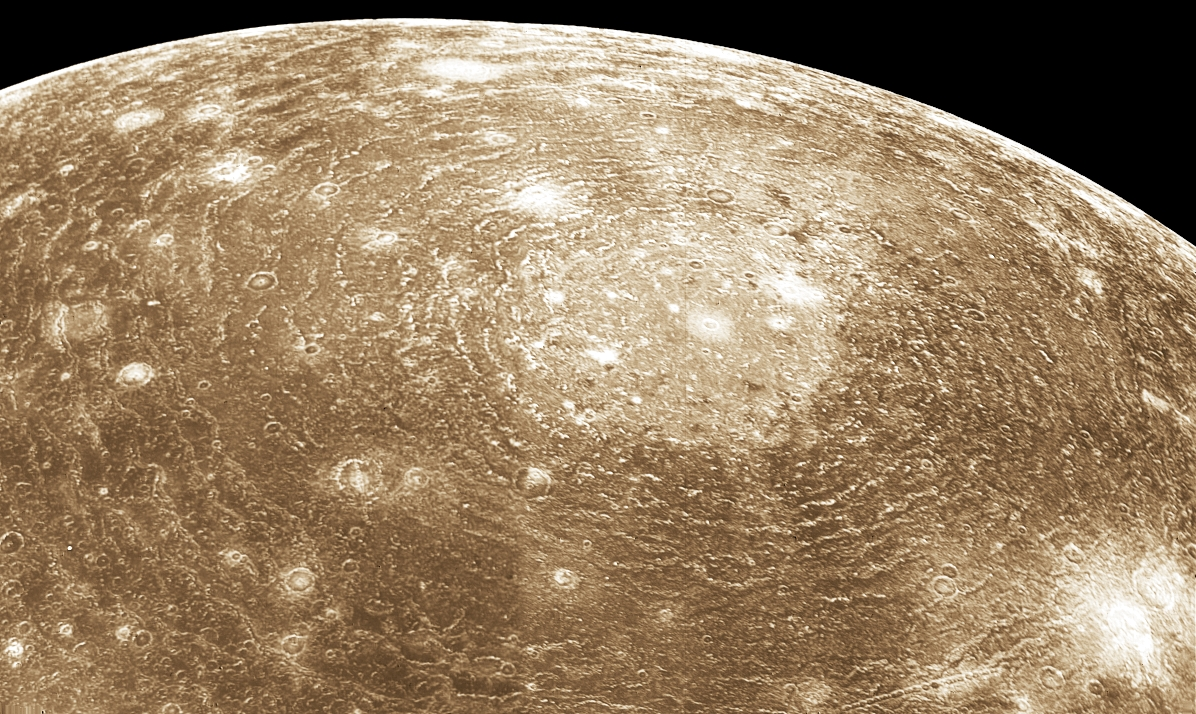
Multi-ringed impact basin Valhalla on Jupiter's moon Callisto

Above a certain threshold size, which varies with planetary gravity, the collapse and modification of the transient cavity is much more extensive, and the resulting structure is called a complex crater. The collapse of the transient cavity is driven by gravity, and involves both the uplift of the central region and the inward collapse of the rim. The central uplift is not the result of elastic rebound, which is a process in which a material with elastic strength attempts to return to its original geometry; rather the collapse is a process in which a material with little or no strength attempts to return to a state of gravitational equilibrium.

Complex craters have uplifted centers, and they have typically broad flat shallow crater floors, and terraced walls. At the largest sizes, one or more exterior or interior rings may appear, and the structure may be labeled an impact basin rather than an impact crater. Complex-crater morphology on rocky planets appears to follow a regular sequence with increasing size: small complex craters with a central topographic peak are called central peak craters, for example Tycho; intermediate-sized craters, in which the central peak is replaced by a ring of peaks, are called peak-ring craters, for example Schrödinger; and the largest craters contain multiple concentric topographic rings, and are called multi-ringed basins, for example Orientale. On icy (as opposed to rocky) bodies, other morphological forms appear that may have central pits rather than central peaks, and at the largest sizes may contain many concentric rings. Valhalla on Callisto is an example of this type.

=== Subsequent modification ===
Long after an impact event, a crater may be further modified by erosion, mass wasting processes, viscous relaxation, or erased entirely. These effects are most prominent on geologically and meteorologically active bodies such as Earth, Titan, Triton, and Io. However, heavily modified craters may be found on more primordial bodies such as Callisto, where many ancient craters flatten into bright ghost craters, or palimpsests. The impact events usually feature a period of enhanced hydrothermal activity and circulation. In a study at Finnish Lappajärvi, researchers could establish that microorganisms has colonized the impact melt rocks in late stages of such hydrothermal circulation, when the temperatures had cooled to habitable conditions.

== Identifying impact craters ==
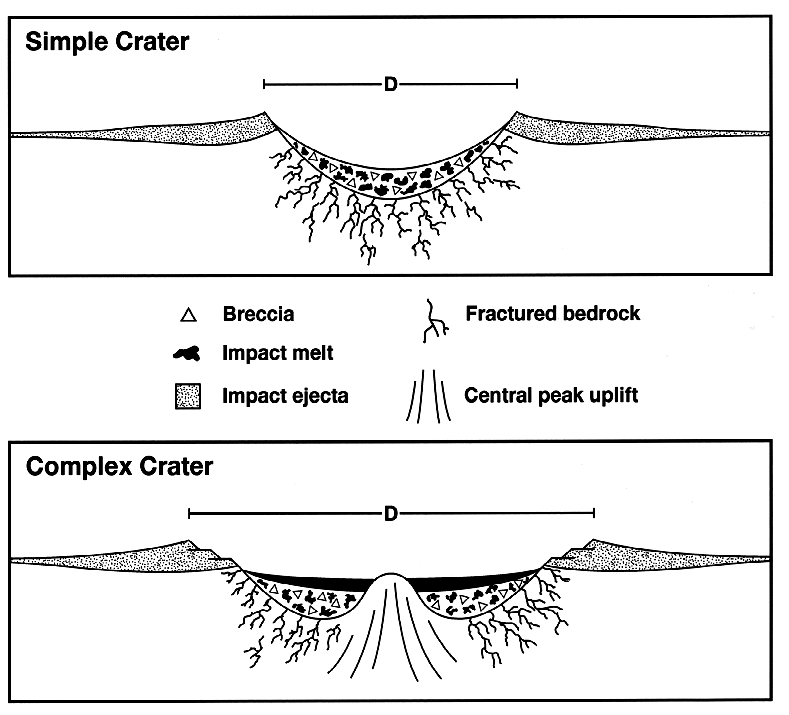
Impact structure of craters: simple and complex craters

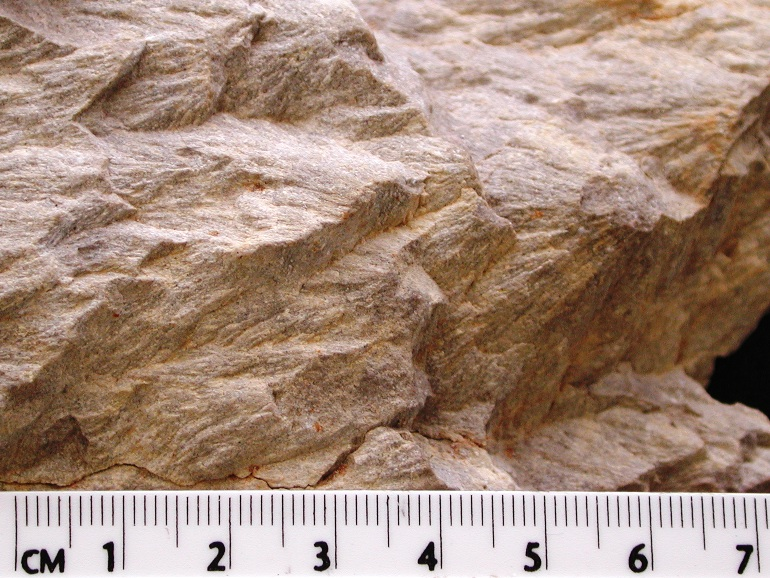
Wells Creek crater in Tennessee, United States: a close-up of shatter cones developed in fine grained dolomite

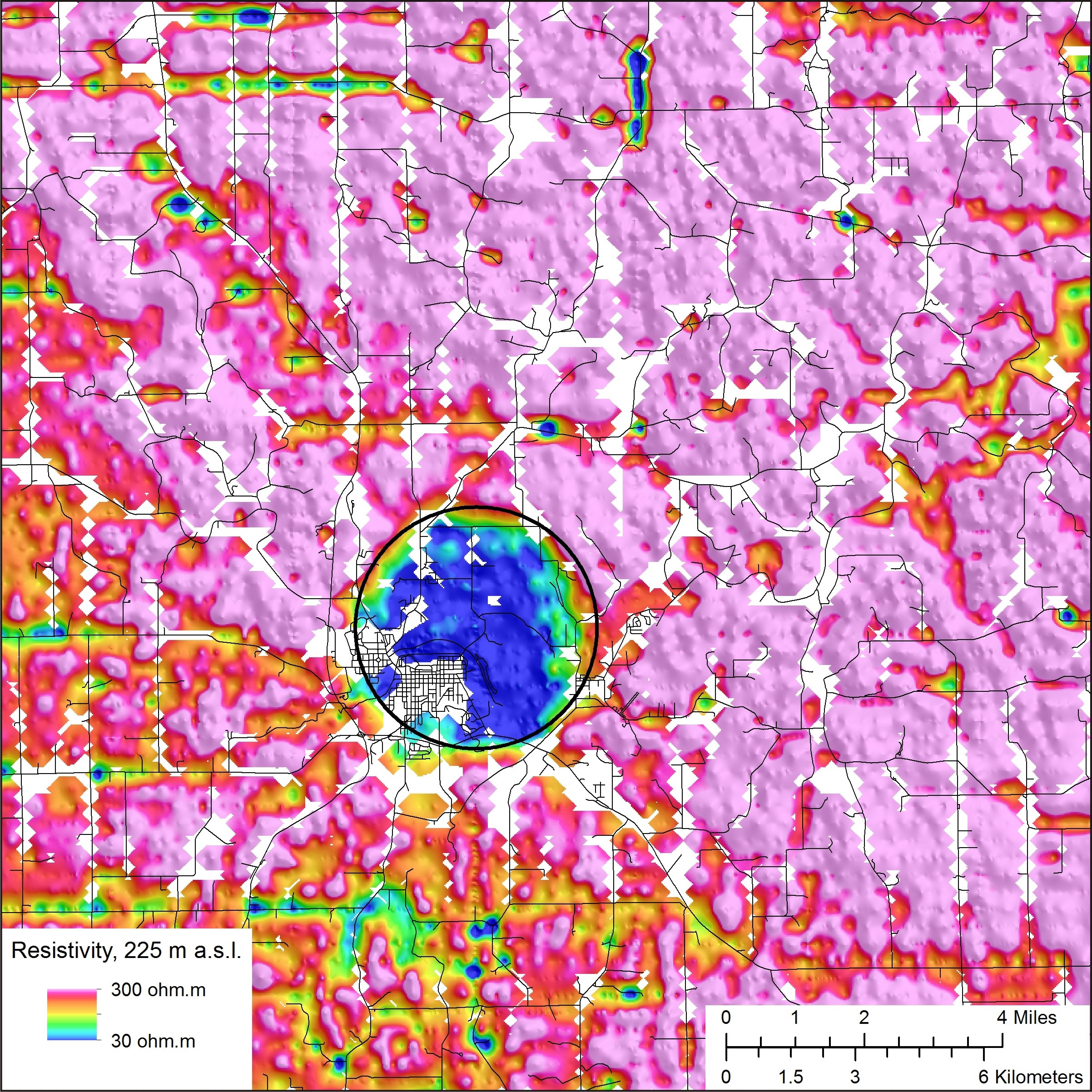
Decorah crater: aerial electromagnetic resistivity map (USGS)

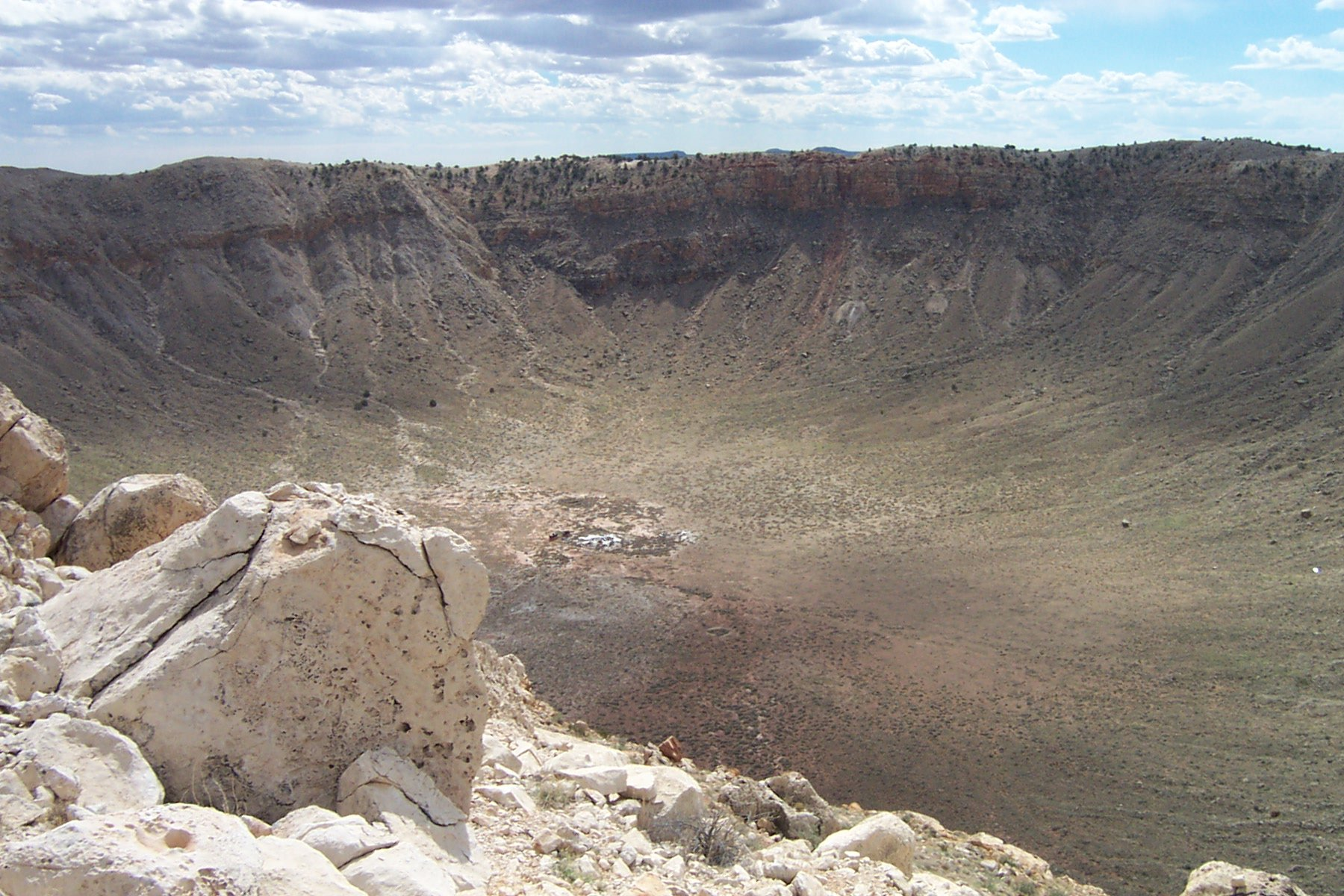
Meteor Crater in the U.S. state of Arizona, was the world's first confirmed impact crater.

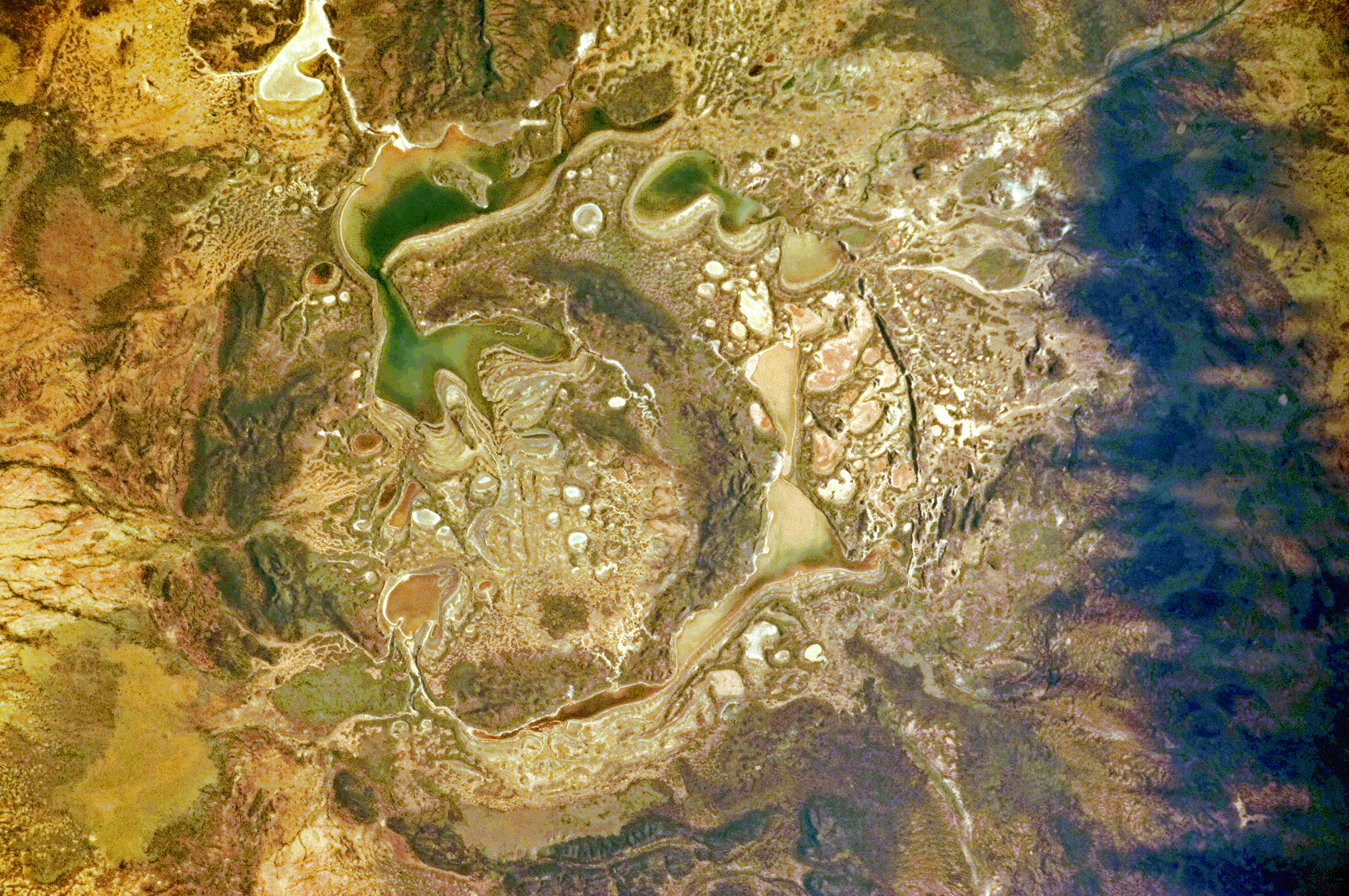
Shoemaker Crater in Western Australia was renamed in memory of Gene Shoemaker.

Non-explosive volcanic craters can usually be distinguished from impact craters by their irregular shape and the association of volcanic flows and other volcanic materials. Impact craters produce melted rocks as well, but usually in smaller volumes with different characteristics.

The distinctive mark of an impact crater is the presence of rock that has undergone shock-metamorphic effects, such as shatter cones, melted rocks, and crystal deformations. The problem is that these materials tend to be deeply buried, at least for simple craters. They tend to be revealed in the uplifted center of a complex crater, however.

Impacts produce distinctive shock-metamorphic effects that allow impact sites to be distinctively identified. Such shock-metamorphic effects can include:

- A layer of shattered or "brecciated" rock under the floor of the crater. This layer is called a "breccia lens".
- Shatter cones, which are chevron-shaped impressions in rocks. Such cones are formed most easily in fine-grained rocks.
- High-temperature rock types, including laminated and welded blocks of sand, spherulites and tektites, or glassy spatters of molten rock. The impact origin of tektites has been questioned by some researchers; they have observed some volcanic features in tektites not found in impactites. Tektites are also drier (contain less water) than typical impactites. While rocks melted by the impact resemble volcanic rocks, they incorporate unmelted fragments of bedrock, form unusually large and unbroken fields, and have a much more mixed chemical composition than volcanic materials spewed up from within the Earth. They also may have relatively large amounts of trace elements that are associated with meteorites, such as nickel, platinum, iridium, and cobalt. Note: scientific literature has reported that some "shock" features, such as small shatter cones, which are often associated only with impact events, have been found also in terrestrial volcanic ejecta.
- Microscopic pressure deformations of minerals. These include fracture patterns in crystals of quartz and feldspar, and formation of high-pressure materials such as diamond, derived from graphite and other carbon compounds, or stishovite and coesite, varieties of shocked quartz.
- Buried craters, such as the Decorah crater, can be identified through drill coring, aerial electromagnetic resistivity imaging, and airborne gravity gradiometry.

== Economic importance ==
On Earth, impact craters have resulted in useful minerals. Some of the ores produced from impact related effects on Earth include ores of iron, uranium, gold, copper, and nickel. It is estimated that the value of materials mined from impact structures is five billion dollars/year just for North America. The eventual usefulness of impact craters depends on several factors, especially the nature of the materials that were impacted and when the materials were affected. In some cases, the deposits were already in place and the impact brought them to the surface. These are called "progenetic economic deposits." Others were created during the actual impact. The great energy involved caused melting. Useful minerals formed as a result of this energy are classified as "syngenetic deposits." The third type, called "epigenetic deposits," is caused by the creation of a basin from the impact. Many of the minerals that our modern lives depend on are associated with impacts in the past. The Vredeford Dome in the center of the Witwatersrand Basin is the largest goldfield in the world, which has supplied about 40% of all the gold ever mined in an impact structure (though the gold did not come from the bolide). The asteroid that struck the region was 9.7 km (6 mi) wide. The Sudbury Basin was caused by an impacting body over 9.7 km (6 mi) in diameter. This basin is famous for its deposits of nickel, copper, and platinum group elements. An impact was involved in making the Carswell structure in Saskatchewan, Canada; it contains uranium deposits. Hydrocarbons are common around impact structures. Fifty percent of impact structures in North America in hydrocarbon-bearing sedimentary basins contain oil/gas fields. Also the Siljan impact crater in Sweden has hydrocarbon occurrences.

== Lists of craters ==
- List of impact craters on Earth
- List of possible impact structures on Earth
- List of craters on Mercury
- List of craters on the Moon
- List of craters on Mars
- List of craters on Venus
- List of geological features on Phobos
- List of craters on Europa
- List of craters on Ganymede
- List of craters on Callisto
- List of geological features on Mimas
- List of geological features on Enceladus
- List of geological features on Tethys
- List of geological features on Dione
- List of geological features on Rhea
- List of geological features on Iapetus
- List of geological features on Puck
- List of geological features on Miranda
- List of geological features on Ariel
- List of craters on Umbriel
- List of geological features on Titania
- List of geological features on Oberon
- List of craters on Triton

=== Impact craters on Earth ===
World map in equirectangular projection of the impact structures on the Earth Impact Database as of November 2017 (in the SVG file, hover over a structure to show its details)

On Earth, the recognition of impact craters is a branch of geology, and is related to planetary geology in the study of other worlds. Out of many proposed craters, relatively few are confirmed. The following twenty are a sample of articles of confirmed and well-documented impact sites.

- Barringer Crater, a.k.a. Meteor Crater (Arizona, United States)
- Chesapeake Bay impact crater (Virginia, United States)
- Chicxulub, Extinction Event Crater (Mexico)
- Clearwater Lakes (Quebec, Canada)
- Gosses Bluff crater (Northern Territory, Australia)
- Haughton impact crater (Nunavut, Canada)
- Kaali crater (Estonia)
- Karakul crater (Tajikistan)
- Lonar crater (India)
- Manicouagan impact structure (Quebec, Canada)
- Manson crater (Iowa, United States)
- Mistastin crater (Labrador, Canada)
- Nördlinger Ries (Germany)
- Pingualuit crater (Quebec, Canada)
- Popigai impact structure, (Siberia, Russia)
- Shoemaker crater (Western Australia, Australia)
- Siljan Ring (Sweden)
- Sudbury Basin (Ontario, Canada)
- Vredefort impact structure (South Africa)
- Wolfe Creek Crater (Western Australia, Australia)

See the Earth Impact Database, a website concerned with 196 (as of August 2026) scientifically confirmed impact craters on Earth.

=== Some extraterrestrial craters ===
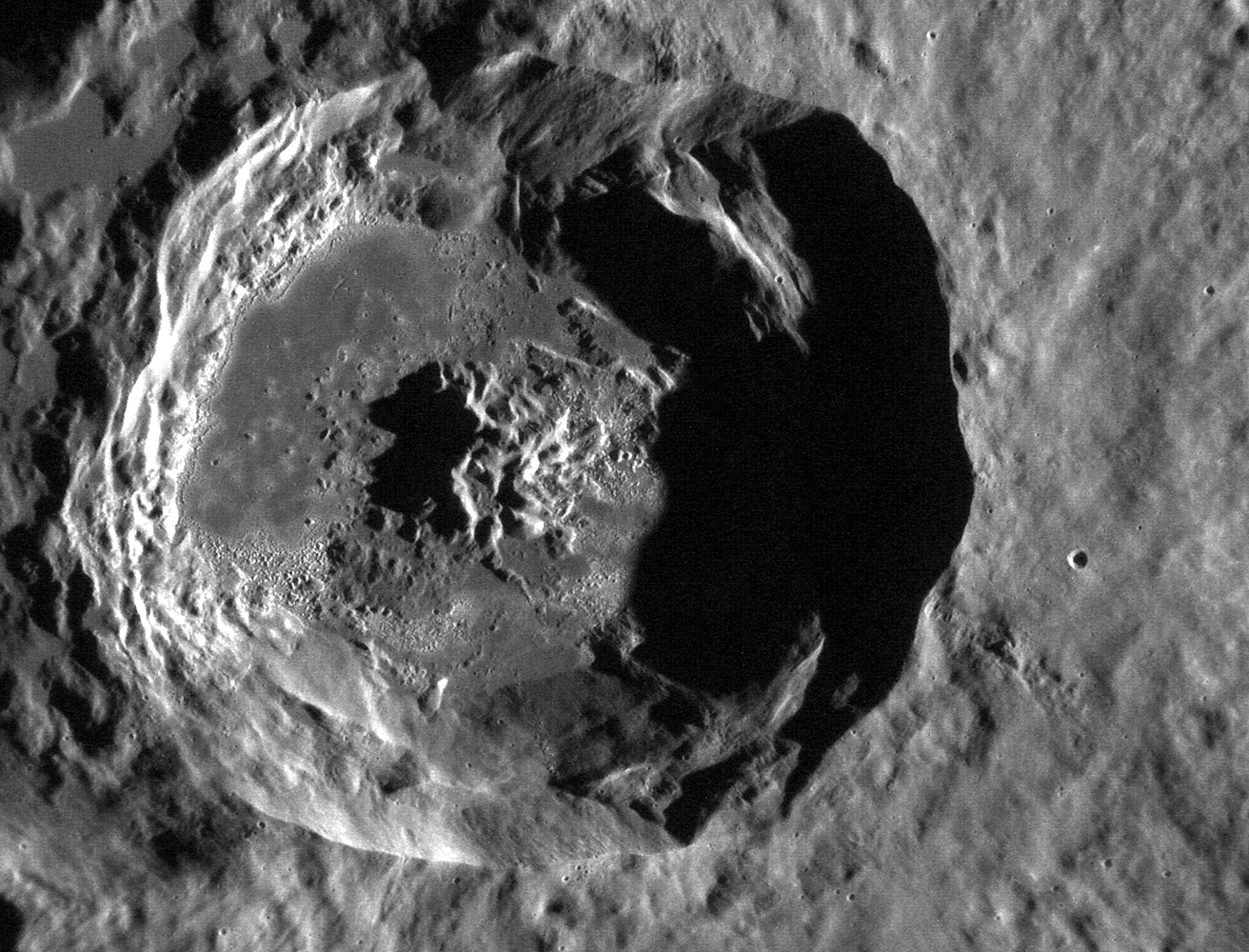
Balanchine crater in Caloris Basin, photographed by MESSENGER, 2011

- Caloris Basin (Mercury)
- Hellas Basin (Mars)
- Herschel crater (Mimas)
- Mare Orientale (Moon)
- Petrarch crater (Mercury)
- South Pole – Aitken basin (Moon)

=== Largest named craters in the Solar System ===
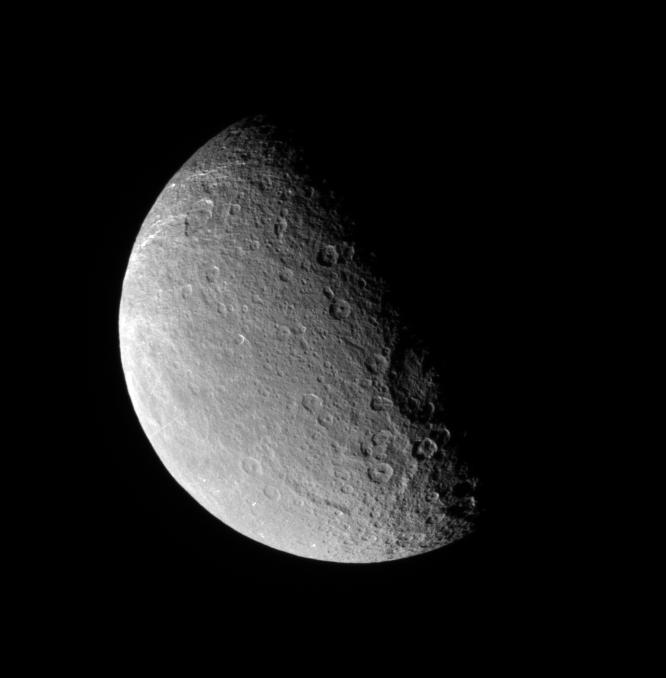
Tirawa crater straddling the terminator on Rhea, lower right.

1. North Polar Basin/Borealis Basin (disputed) – Mars – Diameter: 10,600 km
2. South Pole-Aitken basin – Moon – Diameter: 2,500 km
3. Hellas Basin – Mars – Diameter: 2,100 km
4. Caloris Basin – Mercury – Diameter: 1,550 km
5. Sputnik Planitia – Pluto – Diameter: 1,300 km
6. Imbrium Basin – Moon – Diameter: 1,100 km
7. Isidis Planitia – Mars – Diameter: 1,100 km
8. Mare Tranquilitatis – Moon – Diameter: 870 km
9. Argyre Planitia – Mars – Diameter: 800 km
10. Rembrandt – Mercury – Diameter: 715 km
11. Serenitatis Basin – Moon – Diameter: 700 km
12. Mare Nubium – Moon – Diameter: 700 km
13. Beethoven – Mercury – Diameter: 625 km
14. Valhalla – Callisto – Diameter: 600 km, with rings to 4,000 km diameter
15. Hertzsprung – Moon – Diameter: 590 km
16. Turgis – Iapetus – Diameter: 580 km
17. Apollo – Moon – Diameter: 540 km
18. Engelier – Iapetus – Diameter: 504 km
19. Mamaldi – Rhea – Diameter: 480 km
20. Huygens – Mars – Diameter: 470 km
21. Schiaparelli – Mars – Diameter: 470 km
22. Rheasilvia – 4 Vesta – Diameter: 460 km
23. Gerin – Iapetus – Diameter: 445 km
24. Odysseus – Tethys – Diameter: 445 km
25. Korolev – Moon – Diameter: 430 km
26. Falsaron – Iapetus – Diameter: 424 km
27. Dostoevskij – Mercury – Diameter: 400 km
28. Menrva – Titan – Diameter: 392 km
29. Tolstoj – Mercury – Diameter: 390 km
30. Goethe – Mercury – Diameter: 380 km
31. Malprimis – Iapetus – Diameter: 377 km
32. Tirawa – Rhea – Diameter: 360 km
33. Orientale Basin – Moon – Diameter: 350 km, with rings to 930 km diameter
34. Evander – Dione – Diameter: 350 km
35. Epigeus – Ganymede – Diameter: 343 km
36. Gertrude – Titania – Diameter: 326 km
37. Telemus – Tethys – Diameter: 320 km
38. Asgard – Callisto – Diameter: 300 km, with rings to 1,400 km diameter
39. Vredefort impact structure – Earth – Diameter: 300 km
40. Burney – Pluto – Diameter: 296 km

There are approximately twelve more impact craters/basins larger than 300 km on the Moon, five on Mercury, and four on Mars. Large basins, some unnamed but mostly smaller than 300 km, can also be found on Saturn's moons Dione, Rhea and Iapetus.

== See also ==
- Cretaceous–Paleogene extinction event – Mass extinction event about 66 million years ago
- Crater illusion – Optical illusion
- Expanded crater – Type of secondary impact crater
- Impact depth – Depth of projectile penetration
- Impact event – Collision of two astronomical objects
- Lakes on Mars – Former bodies of water on Mars
- LARLE crater – Class of Martian impact craters
- Nemesis (hypothetical star) – Hypothetical star orbiting the Sun, supposedly responsible for extinction events
- Panspermia – Hypothesis on the interstellar spreading of primordial life
- Pedestal crater – Type of impact carter
- Peter H. Schultz – American astronomer and academic
- Rampart crater – Specific type of impact crater
- Ray system – Radial streaks of material thrown out during formation of an impact crater
- Secondary crater
- Traces of Catastrophe – Comprehensive technical reference on the science of impact craters, 1998 book from Lunar and Planetary Institute – comprehensive reference on impact crater science
