= List of geological features on Iapetus =

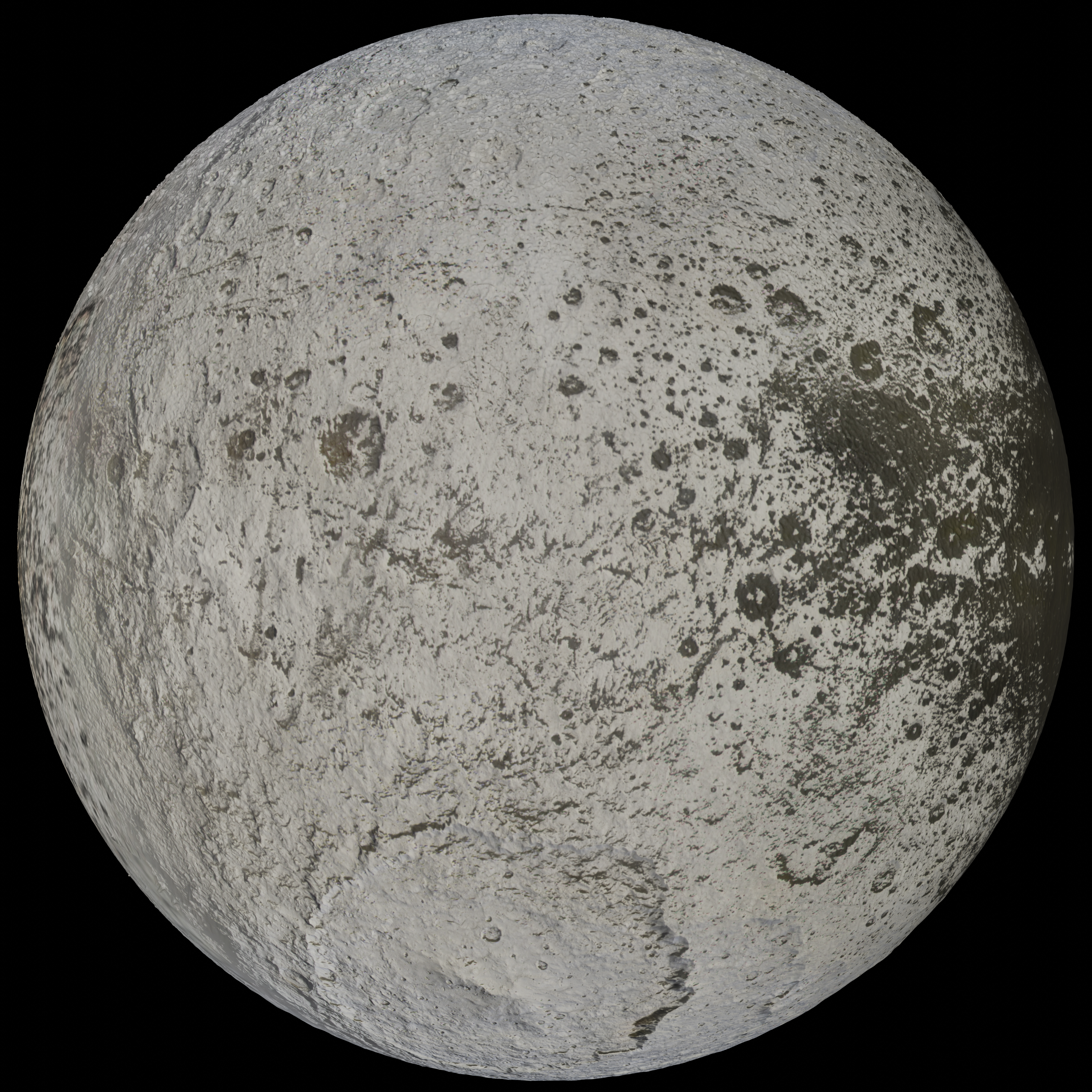
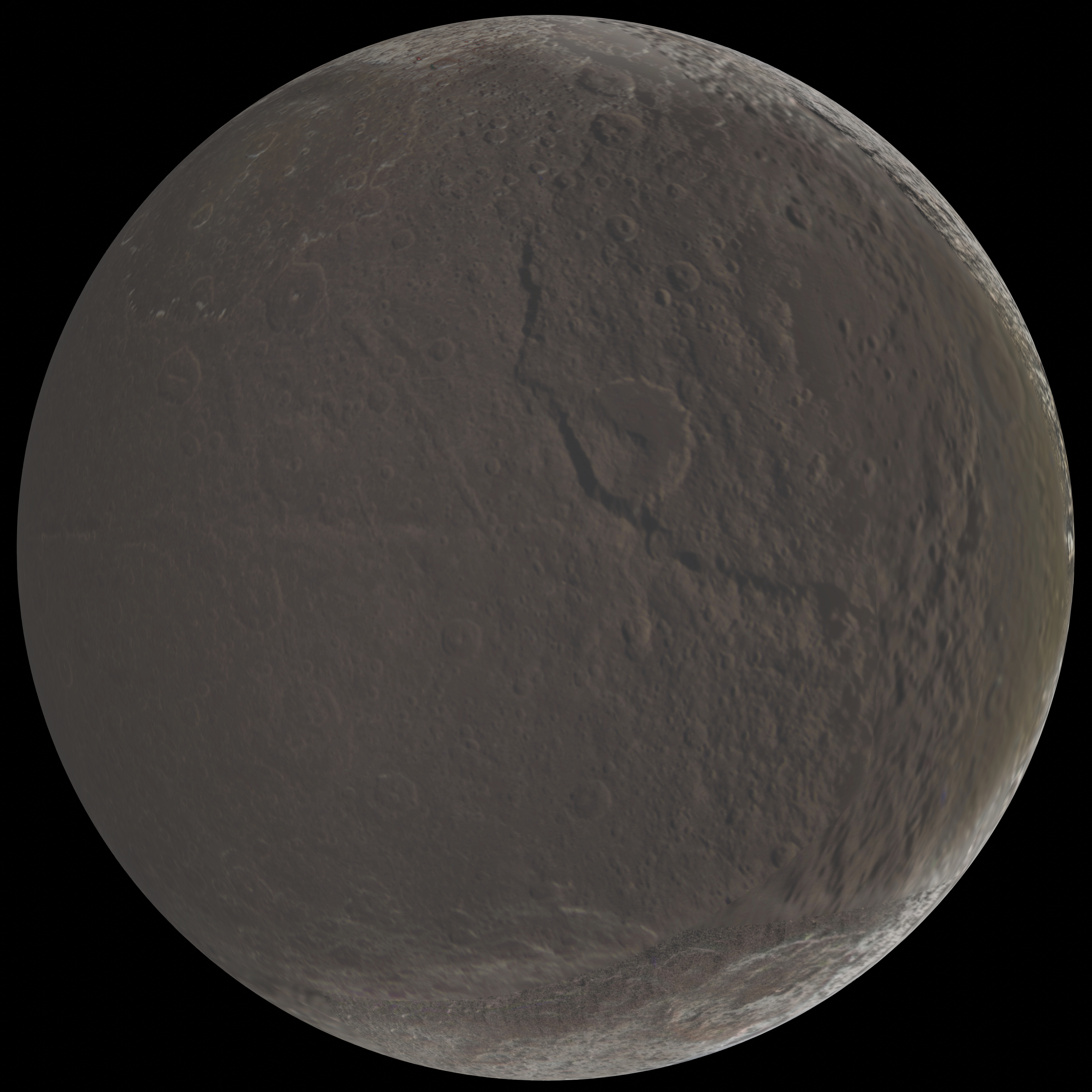

Most Iapetian geological features are named after characters and locations in the Old French epic poem The Song of Roland, specifically the English translation by Dorothy L. Sayers.

== Craters ==
Named impact craters are:

| Name | Coordinates | Diameter (km) | Approval Date | Namesake | Pronunciation | Refs |
|---|---|---|---|---|---|---|
| Abisme | 37.53°N 267.08°W | 767.74 | August 16, 2013 | A Saracen lord, killed by Archbishop Turpin | | WGPSN |
| Acelin | 42.7°N 154.9°W | 38.0 | August 5, 2008 | Aceline of Gascony | | WGPSN |
| Adelroth | 6.6°N 183.6°W | 57.0 | August 5, 2008 | Marsilion's nephew | | WGPSN |
| Almeric | 53.4°N 276.0°W | 43.0 | 1982 | Almeric, one of the Twelve Peers | | WGPSN |
| Anseïs | 40.7°S 290.8°W | 48.0 | August 5, 2008 | One of the Twelve Peers | | WGPSN |
| Astor | 14.9°N 321.2°W | 122.0 | August 5, 2008 | A French baron | | WGPSN |
| Baligant | 16.4°N 224.9°W | 66.0 | 1982 | Baligant | | WGPSN |
| Basan | 33.3°N 194.7°W | 76.0 | 1982 | Bason | | WGPSN |
| Basbrun | 52.0°S 111.8°W | 80.0 | August 5, 2008 | Charlemagne's officer | | WGPSN |
| Basile | 0.7°S 187.9°W | 6.0 | August 5, 2008 | French baron | | WGPSN |
| Berenger | 62.1°N 219.7°W | 84.0 | 1982 | Bérengier | | WGPSN |
| Besgun | 76.0°N 309.8°W | 56.0 | 1982 | Besgun | | WGPSN |
| Bevon | 70.7°N 93.0°W | 48.0 | August 5, 2008 | French baron | | WGPSN |
| Bramimond | 38.0°N 178.0°W | 200.0 | August 5, 2008 | Bramimonde | | WGPSN |
| Charlemagne | 55.0°N 258.8°W | 95.0 | 1982 | Charlemagne | /ˈʃɑːrlɪmeɪn/ | WGPSN |
| Clarin | 18.3°N 71.6°W | 84.0 | August 5, 2008 | Saracen lord | | WGPSN |
| Climborin | 30.4°N 116.9°W | 49.0 | August 5, 2008 | Saracen lord | | WGPSN |
| Corsablis | 0.9°N 114.2°W | 73.0 | August 5, 2008 | Saracen lord | | WGPSN |
| Dapamort | 36.6°N 84.9°W | 49.0 | August 5, 2008 | Saracen king | | WGPSN |
| Engelier | 40.5°S 264.7°W | 504.0 | August 5, 2008 | One of the Twelve Peers | | WGPSN |
| Escremiz | 1.6°N 173.5°W | 0.06 | August 5, 2008 | Escremiz of Valterne | | WGPSN |
| Eudropin | 0.9°N 220.7°W | 42.0 | August 5, 2008 | Saracen lord | | WGPSN |
| Falsaron | 33.8°N 82.6°W | 424.0 | August 5, 2008 | Brother of King Marsilion | | WGPSN |
| Ganelon | 44.3°S 19.8°W | 230.0 | August 5, 2008 | Ganelon | | WGPSN |
| Garlon | 3.2°S 240.5°W | 47.0 | August 5, 2008 | Saracen lord | | WGPSN |
| Geboin | 58.6°N 173.4°W | 81.0 | 1982 | Geboin | | WGPSN |
| Gerin | 45.6°S 233.0°W | 445.0 | August 5, 2008 | One of the Twelve Peers | | WGPSN |
| Godefroy | 71.9°N 249.1°W | 63.0 | 1982 | Godefroy | | WGPSN |
| Grandoyne | 17.7°N 214.5°W | 65.0 | 1982 | Grandoyne | | WGPSN |
| Hamon | 10.6°N 270.0°W | 96.0 | 1982 | Hamon | | WGPSN |
| Ivon | 18.0°N 315.0°W | 100.0 | August 5, 2008 | One of the Twelve Peers | | WGPSN |
| Johun | 12.4°N 83.4°W | 64.0 | August 5, 2008 | Johun of Outremer; Saracen lord | | WGPSN |
| Jurfaleu | 13.0°N 2.5°W | 107.0 | August 5, 2008 | Son of Marsilion | | WGPSN |
| Lorant | 65.2°N 159.8°W | 44.0 | 1982 | Lorant | | WGPSN |
| Malprimis | 15.2°S 118.2°W | 377.0 | August 5, 2008 | Saracen lord | | WGPSN |
| Malun | 5.9°N 41.3°W | 121.0 | August 5, 2008 | Saracen lord | | WGPSN |
| Margaris | 27.7°N 135.8°W | 75.0 | August 5, 2008 | Saracen lord | | WGPSN |
| Marsilion | 39.2°N 176.1°W | 136.0 | 1982 | Marsilion | /mɑːrˈsɪliən/ | WGPSN |
| Matthay | 3.5°S 187.4°W | 58.0 | August 5, 2008 | Saracen lord | | WGPSN |
| Milon | 67.9°N 207.2°W | 119.0 | 1982 | Milon | | WGPSN |
| Naimon | 9.3°N 329.3°W | 244.0 | August 5, 2008 | Naimon | | WGPSN |
| Nevelon | 33.2°S 197.0°W | 49.0 | August 5, 2008 | Shares command of Charlemagne's sixth division | | WGPSN |
| Ogier | 42.5°N 275.1°W | 100.0 | 1982 | Ogier the Dane | | WGPSN |
| Oliver | 62.5°N 200.8°W | 113.0 | 1982 | Olivier | /ˈɒlɪvər/ | WGPSN |
| Othon | 33.3°N 347.8°W | 86.0 | 1982 | Othon | | WGPSN |
| Pinabel | 39.0°S 33.0°W | 83.0 | August 5, 2008 | Pinabel | | WGPSN |
| Priamon | 1.5°N 187.0°W | 17.0 | August 5, 2008 | Saracen lord | | WGPSN |
| Rabel | 64.4°S 166.2°W | 91.0 | August 5, 2008 | French baron | /ˈræbəl/ | WGPSN |
| Roland | 73.3°N 25.2°W | 144.0 | 1982 | Roland | /ˈroʊlənd/ | WGPSN |
| Rugis | 0.1°S 99.0°W | 19.0 | August 5, 2008 | Saracen lord | /ˈruːdʒɪs/ | WGPSN |
| Samson | 6.5°N 298.6°W | 33.0 | August 5, 2008 | One of the Twelve Peers | /ˈsæmsən/ | WGPSN |
| Thierry | 55.0°S 8.0°W | 110.0 | August 5, 2008 | French knight, friend of Roland | | WGPSN |
| Tibbald | 57.0°N 358.0°W | 160.0 | August 5, 2008 | Tibbald of Reims | /ˈtɪbəld/ | WGPSN |
| Timozel | 9.9°S 212.3°W | 58.0 | August 5, 2008 | Saracen lord | | WGPSN |
| Torleu | 0.2°S 188.4°W | 8.0 | August 5, 2008 | Leader in Baligant's army | | WGPSN |
| Turgis | 16.9°N 28.4°W | 580.0 | August 5, 2008 | Saracen baron | /ˈtɜːrdʒɪs/ | WGPSN |
| Turpin | 47.7°N 1.4°W | 87.0 | 1982 | Turpin | /ˈtɜːrpɪn/ | WGPSN |
| Valdebron | 29.6°N 104.4°W | 49.0 | August 5, 2008 | Saracen lord | | WGPSN |

== Montes ==
A mons /ˈmɒnz/, pl. montes /ˈmɒntiːz/, is a mountain.

| Name | Coordinates | Diameter (km) | Approval Date | Namesake | Pronunciation | Refs |
|---|---|---|---|---|---|---|
| Carcassone Montes | 0.0°N 216.7°W | 740.0 | August 5, 2008 | Carcassonne, France | /kɑːrkəˈsoʊn/ | WGPSN |
| Cordova Mons | 0.0°N 206.2°W | 85.0 | August 5, 2008 | Córdoba, Spain | /ˈkɔːrdoʊvə/ | WGPSN |
| Gayne Mons | 0.0°N 176.0°W | 65.0 | August 5, 2008 | Gayne, Spain | | WGPSN |
| Haltile Mons | 0.0°N 190.4°W | 45.0 | August 5, 2008 | Haltile, Spain | | WGPSN |
| Seville Mons | 0.0°N 346.3°W | 69.0 | August 5, 2008 | Seville, Spain | /sɪˈvɪl/ | WGPSN |
| Sorence Mons | 0.0°N 193.7°W | 46.0 | August 5, 2008 | Castle of Pinabel | | WGPSN |
| Toledo Montes | 0.0°N 136.0°W | 1100.0 | August 5, 2008 | Toledo, Spain | /toʊˈliːdoʊ/ | WGPSN |
| Tortelosa Montes | 0.0°N 64.7°W | 294.0 | August 5, 2008 | Tortelosa, Spain | | WGPSN |
| Valterne Mons | 0.0°N 170.6°W | 50.0 | August 5, 2008 | Valterne, Spain | | WGPSN |

== Regiones ==
There is one named Iapetian regio /ˈriːdʒioʊ/ (area of distinct albedo difference), Cassini:

| Name | Coordinates | Diameter (km) | Approval Date | Namesake | Pronunciation | Refs |
|---|---|---|---|---|---|---|
| Cassini Regio | 28.1°S 92.6°W | 0 | 1982 | Giovanni Cassini, discoverer of Iapetus | /kəˈsiːnɪ/ | WGPSN |

== Terrae ==
There are two named Iapetian terrae /ˈtɛriː/ (large 'land' masses).

| Name | Coordinates | Diameter (km) | Approval Date | Namesake | Pronunciation | Refs |
|---|---|---|---|---|---|---|
| Roncevaux Terra | 37.0°N 239.5°W | 1284.0 | 1982 | Battle of Roncevaux Pass | /rɒnsəˈvoʊ/ | WGPSN |
| Saragossa Terra | 45.0°S 180.0°W | 2300.0 | August 5, 2008 | Saragossa, Spain | /særəˈɡɒsə/ | WGPSN |

The adjectival form of Roncevaux is Roncesvallian.
