= Abisme =

Large crater on Iapetus

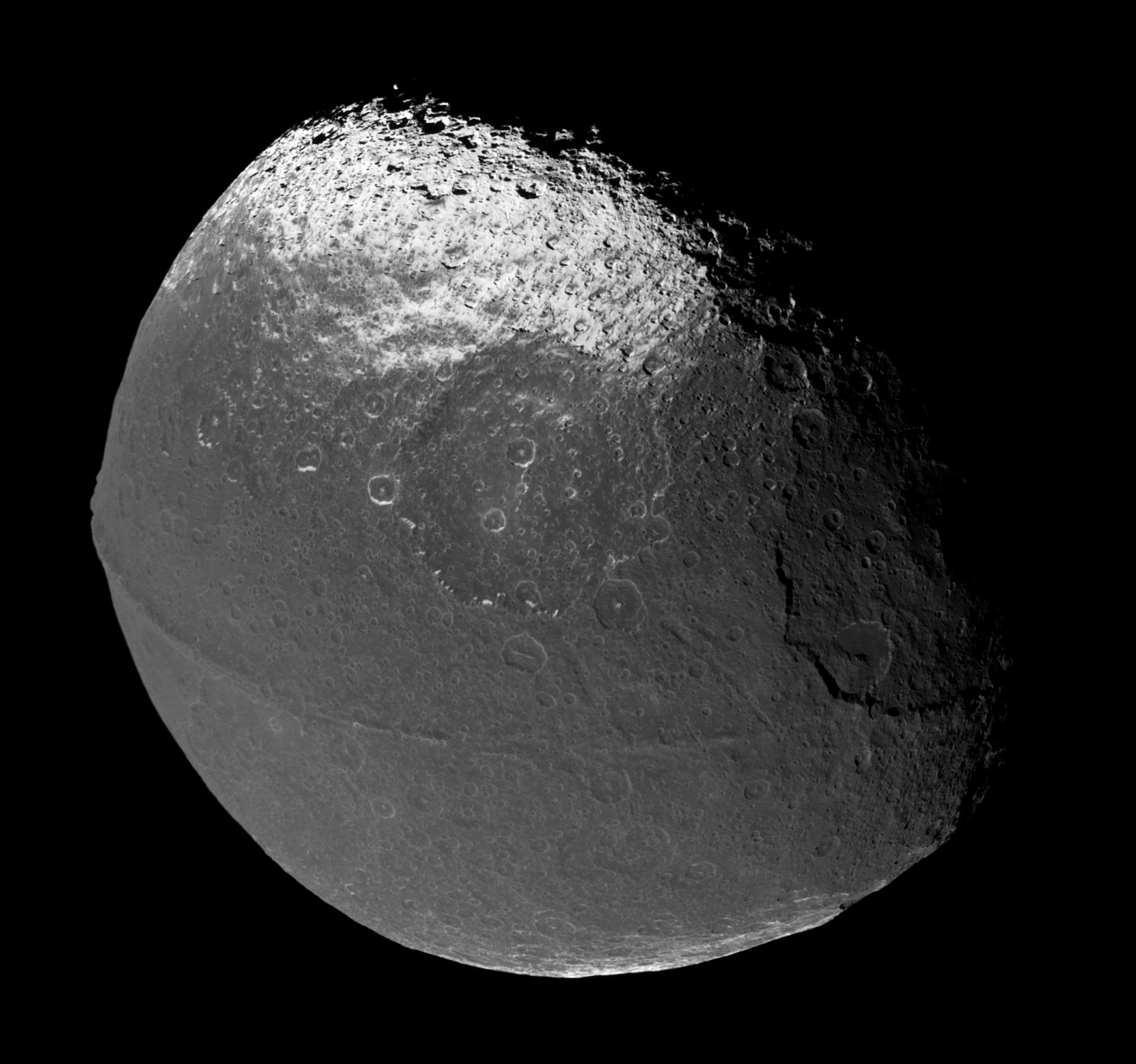
- Photomosaic of Cassini images taken from 172,000 km (107,000 mi), showing the dark Cassini Regio, with Abisme in the center. The crater Falsaron occupies much of Abisme's center
- Feature type: Impact crater
- Location: Cassini Regio, Iapetus
- Coordinates: 37°32′N 92°55′W
- Diameter: ~767.7 km (477.0 mi)
- Eponym: Abisme, from the Song of Roland

Abisme /æˈbiːm/ is the largest known impact basin on Iapetus, located on Cassini Regio at 37.5°N, 267.1°E. Craters such as Falsaron Climborin, Clarin, Dapamort, Johun and Valdebron can be found inside Abisme. It was imaged for the first time by the Cassini spacecraft in 2004. It has a diameter of 767.7 km, and covers 52% of the moon's diameter, making it included among the largest craters in the Solar System.

== Nomenclature ==
Abisme is named after a Saracen baron in the Old French epic poem Song of Roland;this name was approved by the International Astronomical Union (IAU) on 16 August 2013.

== See also ==
- List of geological features on Iapetus

== External sources ==
Map of Iapetus
