= Cordova Mons =

Mountain on Iapetus

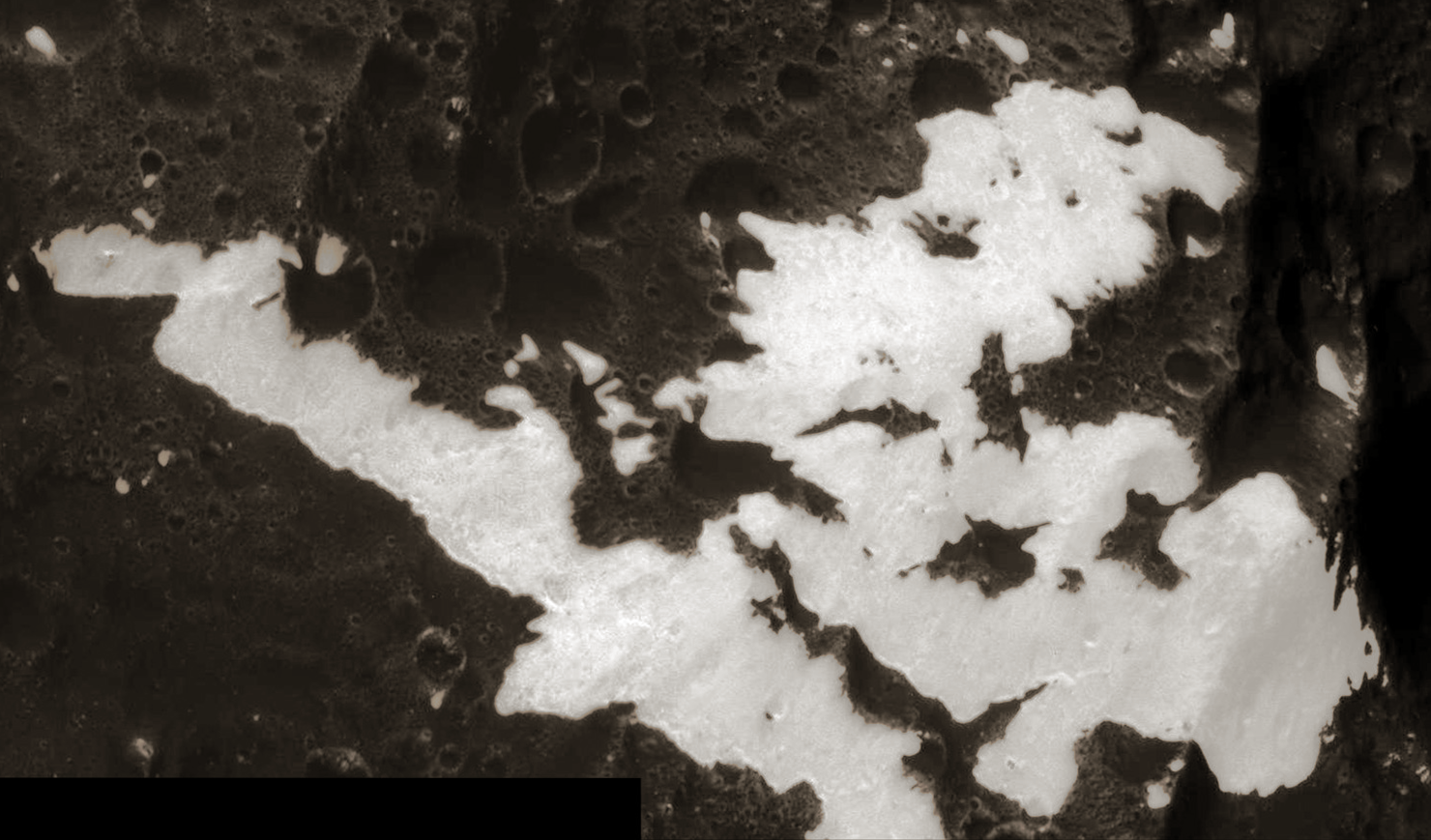
- An image of Cordova Mons, showing the mountain peak covered in bright white icy material, taken by the Cassini space probe on 10 September 2007.
- Feature type: Mountain
- Location: Iapetus
- Coordinates: 0.00°N 206.20°W
- Diameter: 85 kilometres (53 mi)
- Eponym: Córdoba, Spain

Cordova Mons is one of the mountains that make up the equatorial ridge on Iapetus, the third-largest moon of Saturn. It is located exactly on the moon's equator. Cordova Mons is also one of the six or seven mountains that form the mountain range known as Carcassone Montes.

== Naming ==
With the exception of Cassini Regio, all geological features and craters on Iapetus are formally named after characters and places from the Frankish medieval epic poem the Song of Roland. Mountains and mountain ranges on Iapetus, in particular, are named after places where the events of the poem took place.

Cordova Mons is named after the city of Córdoba in Spain. Córdoba was conquered by Muslim Arabs from the Christian Visigoths in the 8th century CE, and it became a center of the Muslim world in the medieval Western hemisphere for centuries until it was taken by the Christian Spanish forces in the 13th century CE during the Reconquista. The Song of Roland claims that Córdoba was captured by Charlemagne from its Muslim rulers during his lifetime, but this is anachronistic and historically impossible, as Charlemagne lived in the 8th–9th centuries CE—four centuries before the city was actually conquered by Christian forces.

The International Astronomical Union (IAU), the organization responsible for formally naming celestial bodies and their surface features, approved the name for Cordova Mons in August 2008.

== Discovery ==
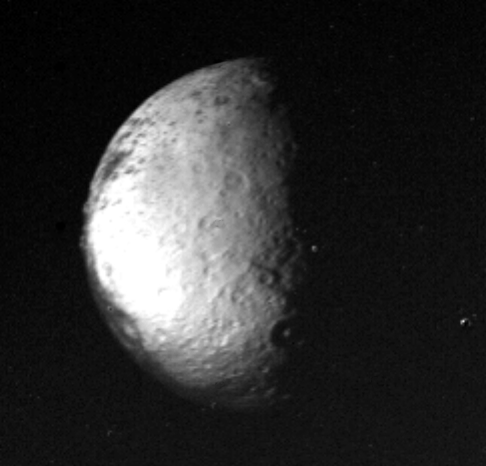
An image of Iapetus's north pole, which served as one of the discovery images of Cordova Mons, taken by Voyager 2 in August 1981. Cordova Mons is one of the mountain peaks protruding from the left side of the moon in this image.

Cordova Mons was first seen in images taken by Voyager 2 during its brief flyby of Saturn in August 1981. As Voyager 2 passed over Iapetus's north pole at a great distance of 909,000 km (565,000 mi), bright strings of dots appeared along the moon's equator, near its limb from the spacecraft's perspective. These bright dots seem to protrude above the surrounding dark terrain on Iapetus. Cordova Mons and its sibling mountain peaks are so high that they clearly distort the spherical shape of Iapetus.

When the Cassini space probe arrived at Saturn in July 2004, it was able to perform close flybys of Iapetus. These flybys, particularly the one in September 2007, confirmed that some of the bright dots in the older Voyager images were actually the white peak of Cordova Mons rising above the surrounding dark terrain.

== Location and geology ==
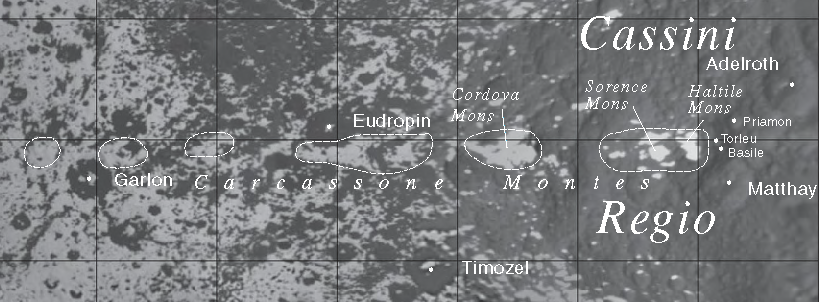
A Mercator projector map of Carcassone Montes with labels, showing the individual mountain peaks that are considered as members of the Carcassone mountain range.

Cordova Mons is a middle member of the Carcassone mountain range (i.e. Carcassone Montes). From west to east, it is the fifth component of Carcassone Montes. Like its parent mountain range, Cordova Mons lies exactly on Iapetus' equator and at the transition zone between the bright and dark sides of Iapetus. Thanks to its peculiar location and the white ice covering its peak, Cordova Mons appears as a bright spot on the moon glistening in sunlight, standing out in contrast to the dark surrounding terrain when viewed from space.

To the west of Cordova Mons lies the crater Eudropin and the bright hemisphere of Iapetus, while to its east lie the craters Basile, Torleu, Priamon, and Matthay along with the rest of Iapetus's dark side, known as Cassini Regio. To the south lies the crater Timozel.

In the past, Cordova Mons, together with its parent mountain range, Carcassone Montes, was once considered part of the Voyager Mountains, the informal name for Iapetus's equatorial ridge. Today, both features have been given their own formal names.

== Origin and natural history ==
Like the rest of Iapetus's enormous equatorial ridge, the origin of Cordova Mons and its parent range, Carcassone Montes, remains unknown. One key clue to their formation is the heavy cratering observed across the ridge, indicating that Cordova Mons and all other surrounding structures are extremely ancient.

Several hypotheses have been proposed to explain this feature, but none fully account for all its characteristics. Some suggest that Cordova Mons and the ridge are remnants of Iapetus's earlier oblate shape, formed when the moon rotated more rapidly. Others propose that they resulted from the collapse of a former ring system, or from the upwelling of icy material from the moon's interior.

== Exploration ==
During Cassini's very close flyby of Iapetus in September 2007, at a minimum distance of 1,227 kilometres (762 mi), the probe was able to resolve details as small as 55 metres (180 ft) per pixel on Cordova Mons. The images captured during this flyby remain the clearest available of any part of Iapetus to date.

As of 2026, there are no approved future missions to Iapetus.

== See also ==
- List of geological features on Iapetus
