= Carcassone Montes =

Mountain range on Iapetus moom

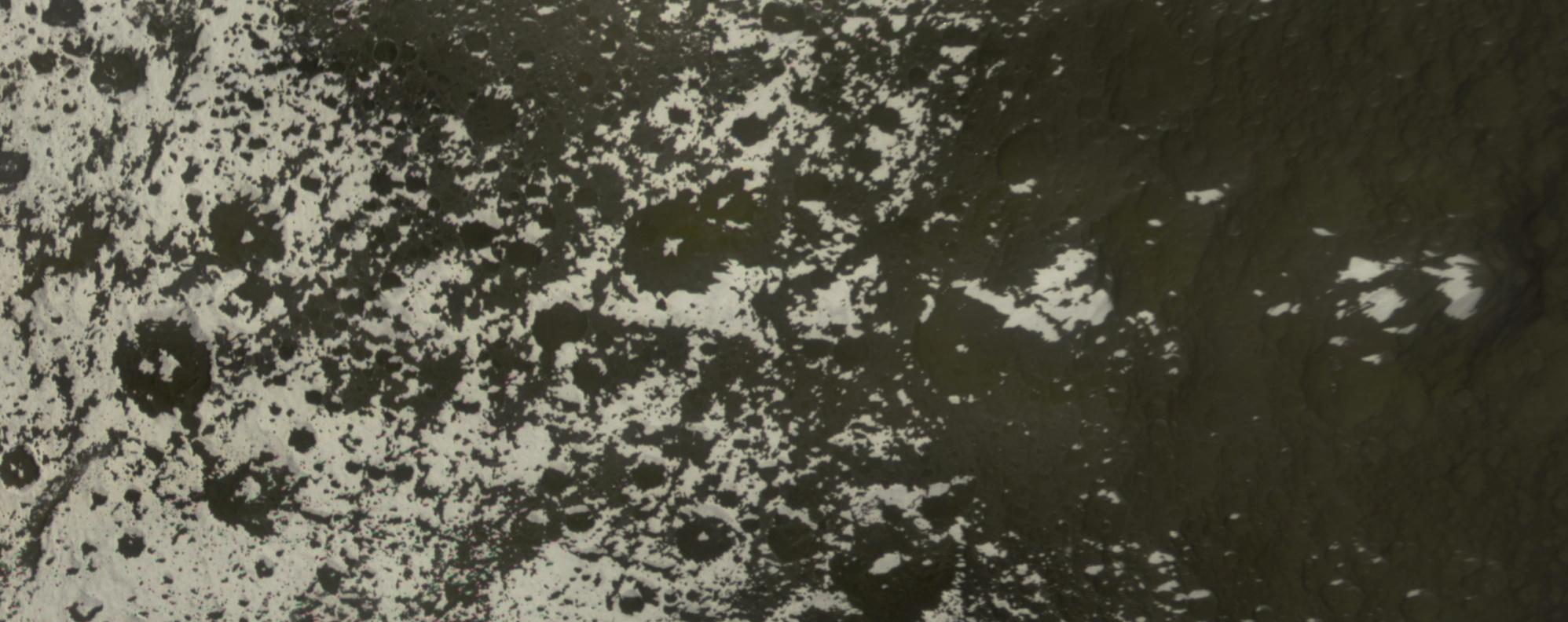
- A Mercator projection of Carcassone Montes, assembled from several images taken by the Cassini space probe during its multiple flybys of Iapetus, particularly on 10 September 2007.
- Feature type: Mountain Range
- Location: Iapetus
- Coordinates: 0.00°N 216.70°W
- Length: 740 kilometres (460 mi)
- Eponym: Carcassonne, France

Carcassone Montes is one of the three mountain range segments of the enigmatic equatorial ridge on Iapetus, Saturn's third largest moon. It is located at the moon's equator, running almost exactly along it for approximately 740 kilometres (460 mi).

== Naming ==
With the exception of Cassini Regio, all geological features and craters on Iapetus are formally named after characters and places from a Frankish medieval epic poem called the Song of Roland. In particular, mountains and mountain ranges on Iapetus are named after places where the events of the poem took place.

Carcassonne Montes is named after the important walled city of Carcassonne in southern France, which, according to the epic poem, was sacked by Roland, the poem’s protagonist. The International Astronomical Union (IAU), the organization responsible for formally naming celestial bodies and surface features on them, approved the name for Carcassone Montes in August 2008.

The spelling of Carcassone Montes differs slightly from that of the city of Carcassonne.

== Discovery ==
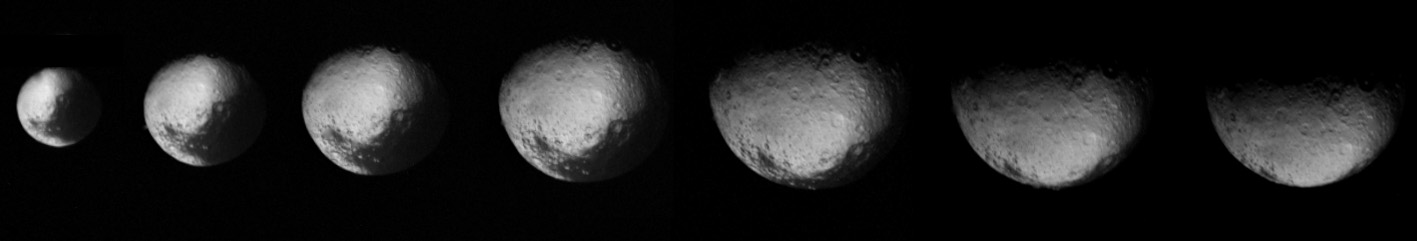
A series of images of Iapetus's north pole taken by Voyager 2 as it flew by the moon in August 1981. The white dots at the lower part of the images (Iapetus's equator) hinted at the presence of high mountains there which will later turn out to be Carcassone Montes and the rest of the equatorial ridge.

Carcassone Montes was first seen in images taken by Voyager 2 in August 1981, during the probe's brief flyby of Saturn and its system of moons. As Voyager 2 passed over Iapetus's north pole, bright strings of dots appeared along the moon’s equator, near the edge of the moon from the spacecraft’s perspective. These bright dots were seen protruded above the surrounding dark material on Iapetus.

The nature of these bright spots remained debated for decades until the Cassini space probe arrived in the Saturnian system in July 2004. Its close flybys of Iapetus confirmed that the bright dots were actually the white peaks of Carcassone Montes, rising above the dark terrain surrounding them.

== Location and Geology ==
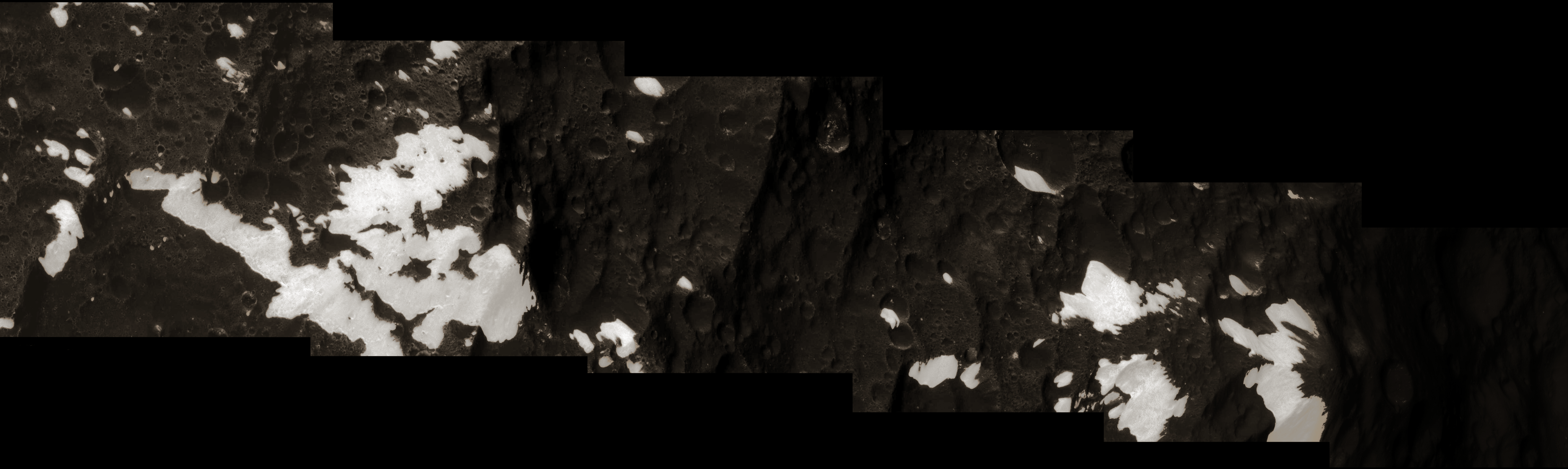
A closeup, mosaic image of Carcassone Montes, clearly showing bright material splattering across the dark terrain of Iapetus. The white area on the left is Cordova Mons, while the white areas on the right are Sorence Mons and Haltile Mons. This image was taken by the Cassini space probe in September 2007.

Carcassone Montes forms the westernmost section of the equatorial ridge on Iapetus. It lies exactly at the transition zone between the bright and dark sides of Iapetus. Because of its location, the mountain range is dotted with several overlapping bright and dark patches. Many of the highest peaks of Carcassone Montes are covered with bright, icy material that glistens in sunlight strongly in contrast to their darker surroundings.

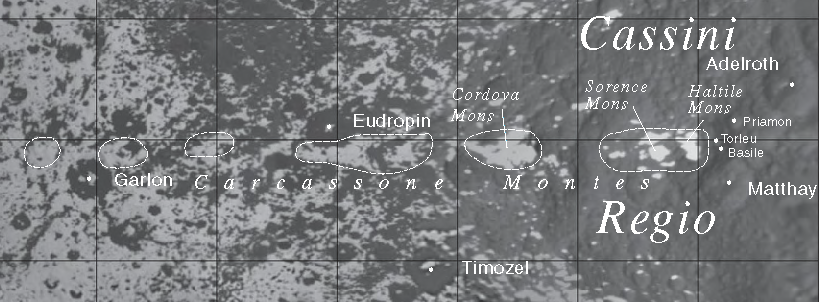
A Mercator projector map of Carcassone Montes with labels, showing the individual mountain peaks that are considered as parts of Carcassone.

Officially, Carcassone Montes runs from 188°W to 246°W (172°E to 114°E) on Iapetus' surface. It runs almost perfectly along the equator of the moon. Carcassone Montes is composed of at least six sets of mountains that are partly broken from each other. Only the three easternmost mountains have names: Cordova Mons, Sorence Mons and Haltile Mons.

To the north of Carcassone Montes lies the crater Eudropin, while to its east lie the craters Basile, Torleu, Priamon, and Matthay. The rest of Iapetus's dark side, known as Cassini Regio, dominates the area further east of the mountain range. To the south lies the crater Timozel.

Carcassone Montes is an isolated section of Iapetus's equatorial ridge. It is not connected to the rest of the unbroken equatorial ridge chain located on the dark side of Iapetus, unlike the continuous Toledo Montes.

In the past, Carcasonne Montes was once considered a part of Voyager Mountains, the informal name of the equatorial ridge of Iapetus, together with Toledo Montes, and Tortelosa Montes.

== Origin ==
Like the rest of Iapetus's gigantic equatorial ridge, the origin of Carcassone Montes remains a mystery to this day. The only clue to its origin is the fact that the mountain range is very heavily cratered, indicating that Carcassone and the rest of the equatorial ridge are extremely ancient. The reason why Carcassone Montes almost perfectly follows Iapetus's equator is also difficult to explain. Several hypotheses have been proposed to explain this feature, but none of them are satisfactory. Some theories suggest that Carcassonne Montes and the ridge are remnants of Iapetus’s oblate shape during its early history, when the moon was likely spinning faster than it does today. Other theories suggest they formed from the collapse of a former ring system, or that they arose from icy material upwelling from the moon's interior. As of 2026, none of these theories has been widely accepted as true.

== Exploration ==
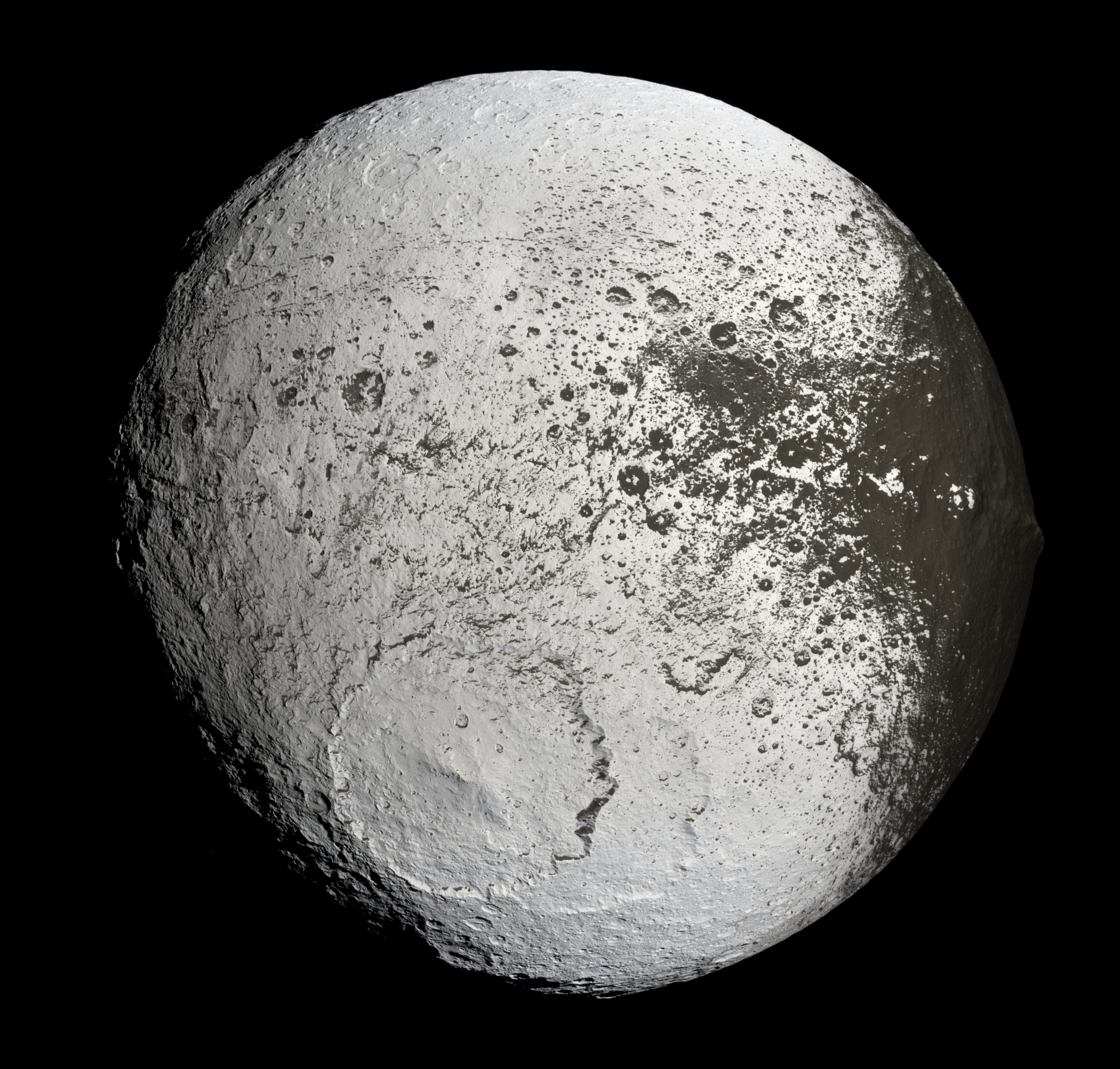
A global image of Iapetus, showing Carcassone Montes, the region of overlapping bright and dark areas, slightly to the right of the center of the image. This image was taken on September 2007 by Cassini.

Carcassone Montes was discovered by Voyager 2 in August 1981, but it was only when Cassini arrived at Saturn that Carcassone Montes was clearly seen in detail.

Cassini made its closest approach to Carcassone Montes during its very close flyby of Iapetus on 10 September 2007. The probe was able to resolve details as small as 55 metres (180 ft) per pixel during its flyby of the moon at a minimum distance of 1,227 kilometres (762 mi). Cassini made no subsequent flybys of Iapetus after this close encounter.

As of 2026, there are no approved future missions to Iapetus.

== See also ==
- List of geological features on Iapetus
