= Gerin (crater) =

Impact crater on Saturn's moon Iapetus

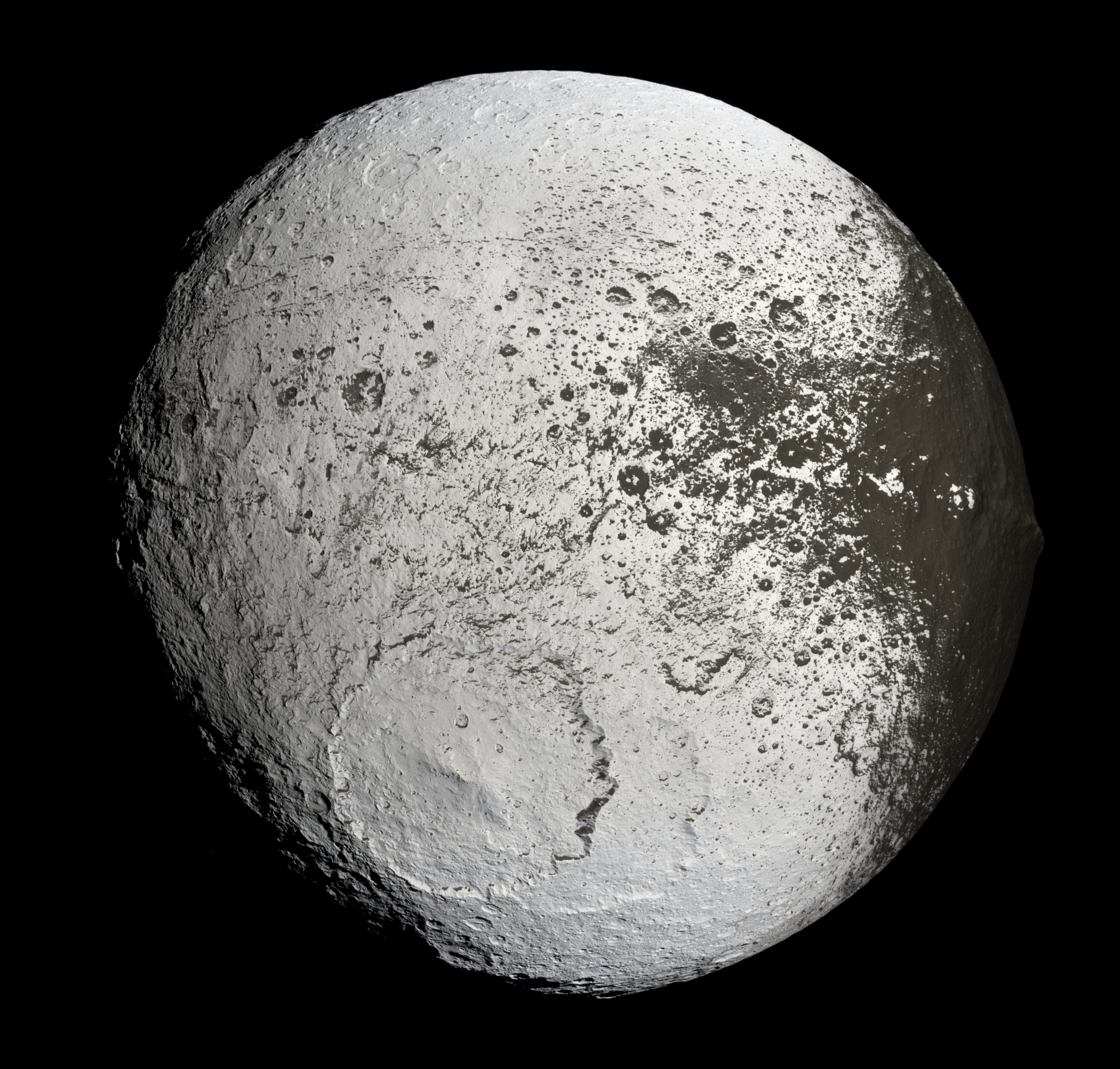
Cassini mosaic of Iapetus. Crater Gerin is located southwestern of crater Engelier (lower left).

Gerin is 445 km (313 mile) wide impact crater on Saturn's moon Iapetus, located on Saragossa Terra. It is partially obscured by the larger crater, Engelier, whose formation has destroyed about half of Gerin. Gerin is located at 45.6°S 233°W

== Nomenclature ==
Crater Gerin is named after one of the Twelve Peers in the French epic Song of Roland; this name was approved by the International Astronomical Union in 2008.

== See also ==
- List of geological features on Iapetus
