= Turgis (crater) =

Largest crater on Saturn's moon Iapetus

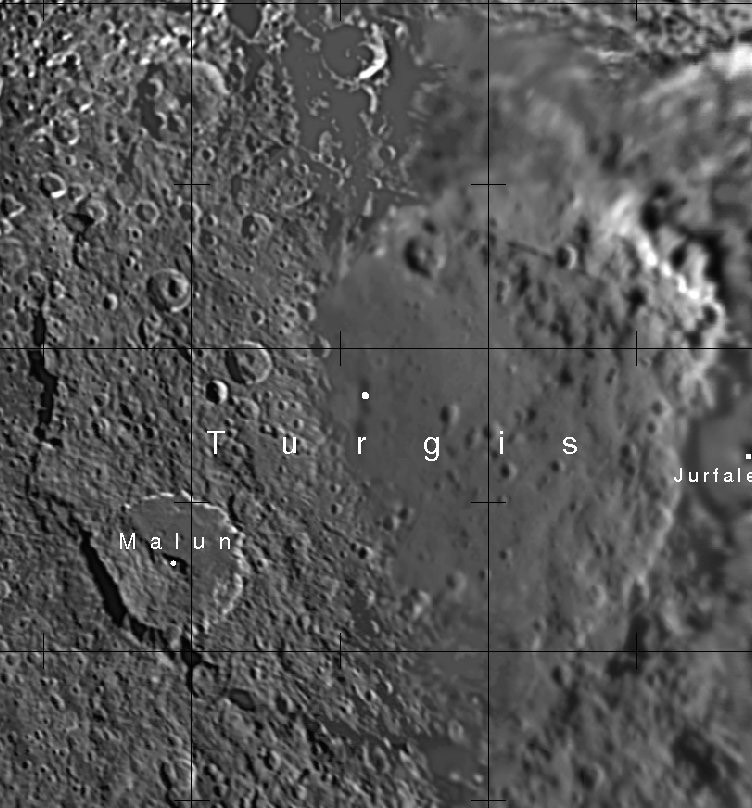
- The 580km Turgis crater on Saturn's moon Iapetus, with the overlapping crater Malun at lower left
- Feature type: Impact crater
- Location: Cassini Regio, Iapetus
- Coordinates: 16°54′N 28°24′W
- Diameter: ~580 km (360 mi)
- Eponym: Turgis, from the Song of Roland

Turgis /ˈtɜːrdʒɪs/ is the second largest known crater on Saturn's moon Iapetus. It is 580 km in diameter, 40% of the moon's diameter and one of the largest craters in the Solar System. It is named after a Saracen baron, Turgis of Turtelose (Tortosa).

It is located in Cassini Regio at 16.9°N, 28.4°W. The rim has a scarp about 15 km high that generated a landslide. It is overlain by Malun, the 13th-largest crater on Iapetus.

== Gallery ==
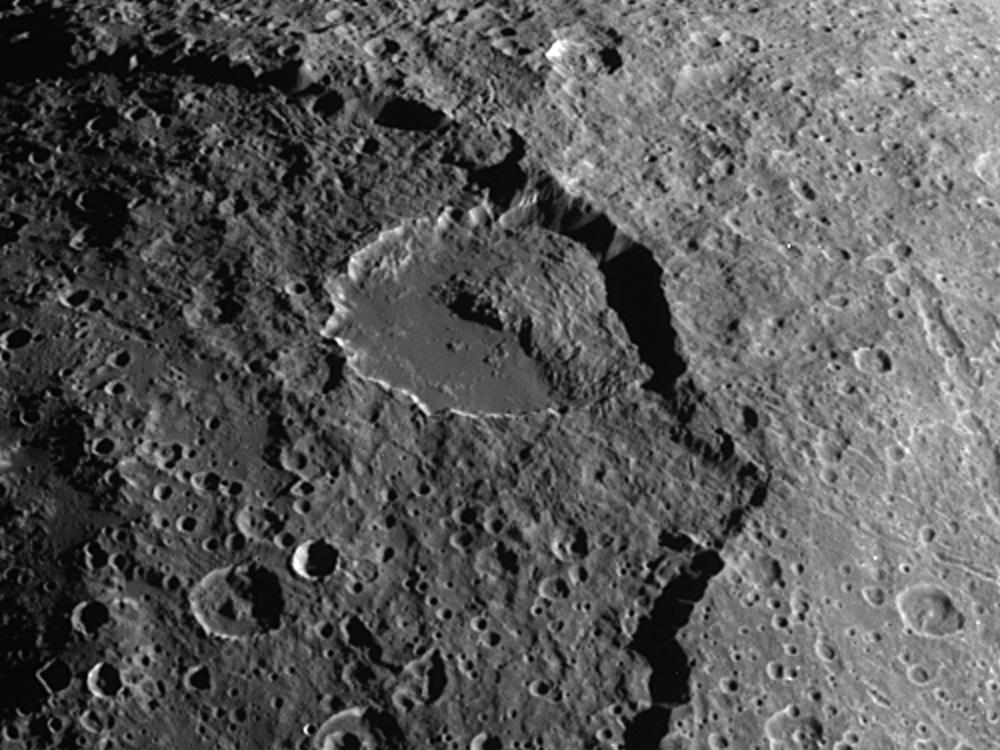
Landslide in Malun crater

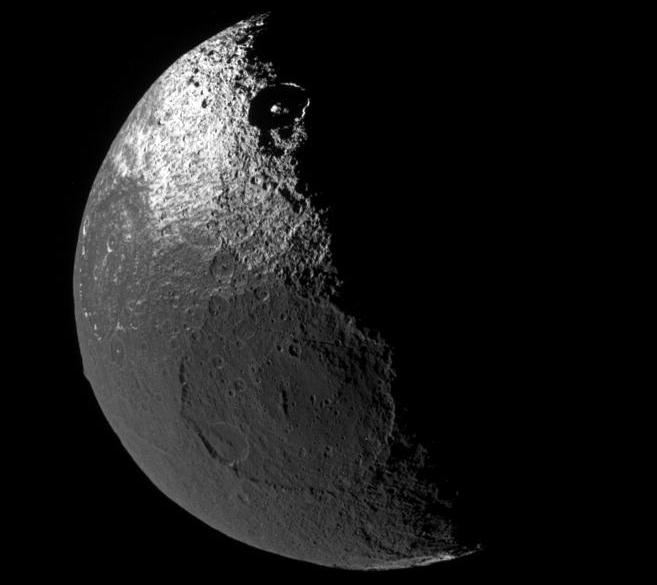
Cassini Regio

== See also ==
- List of geological features on Iapetus
