= Roland (crater) =

Crater on Iapetus

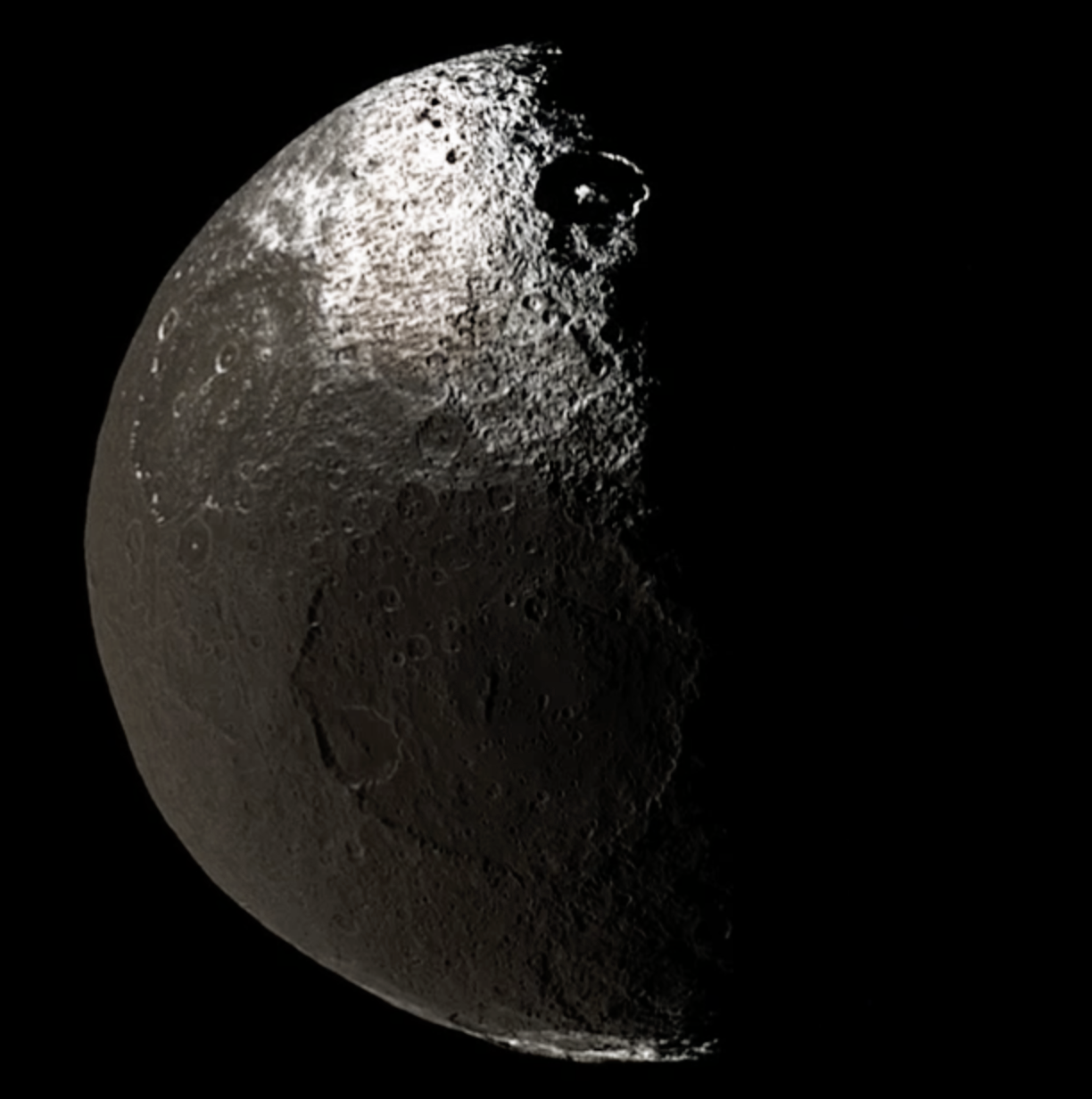
- One of the clearest images of Roland to date, located in the partly-shadowed upper part this image of Iapetus. The image shows that the crater has a central peak. It was imaged by the Cassini spacecraft on 12 November 2005.
- Feature type: Impact crater
- Location: Iapetus
- Coordinates: 73.30°N 25.20°W
- Diameter: 144 km
- Eponym: Roland of Song of Roland

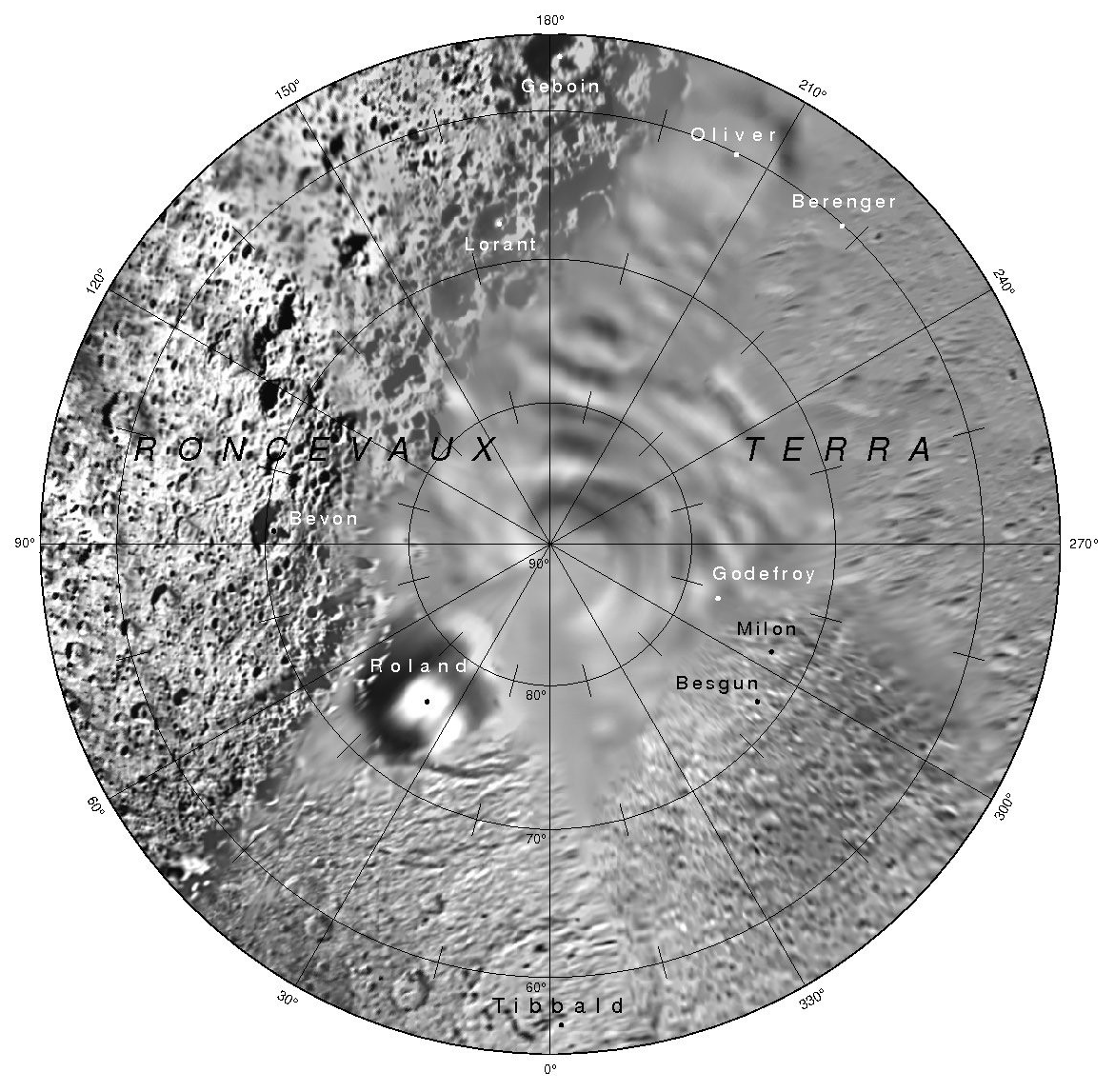
The azimuthal projection of Iapetus' north pole showing the crater Roland

Roland is a 144 km-wide (89-mile) crater near the north pole of Iapetus, a moon of the planet Saturn. It lies inside one of the bright areas on Iapetus called Roncevaux Terra. Images of Roland show that it has a central peak.

It is named after Roland, the titular main character and protagonist of the Song of Roland, a medieval epic poem. All other surface features on Iapetus are named after characters of this poem.

== Exploration ==
No high-resolution image of Iapetus's north pole has been taken up to date. This makes it difficult to make a highly detailed map of Roland.

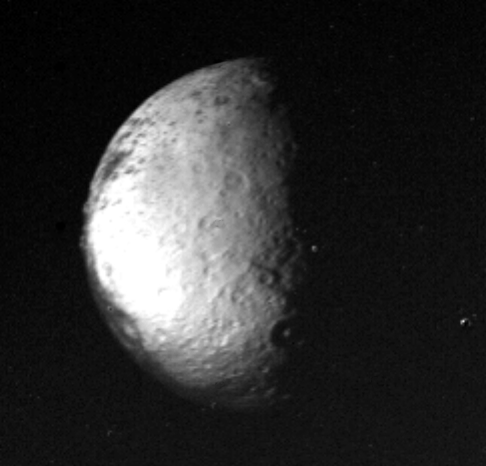
One of the first-ever images of Roland, seen in the lower right of the image near the moon's terminator with its central peak rising out of the shadowed inside of its crater.

The first probe to photograph Roland was Voyager 2, which passed by the north pole of Iapetus on 22 August 1981, during its flyby of Saturn.

The latest mission to visit Saturn was the Cassini spacecraft which arrived at Saturn starting on 1 July 2004. It provided the clearest and best images of Roland during its scheduled flyby on November 12, 2005.

== See also ==
- List of geological features on Iapetus
