= Falsaron (crater) =

Crater located on Iapetus

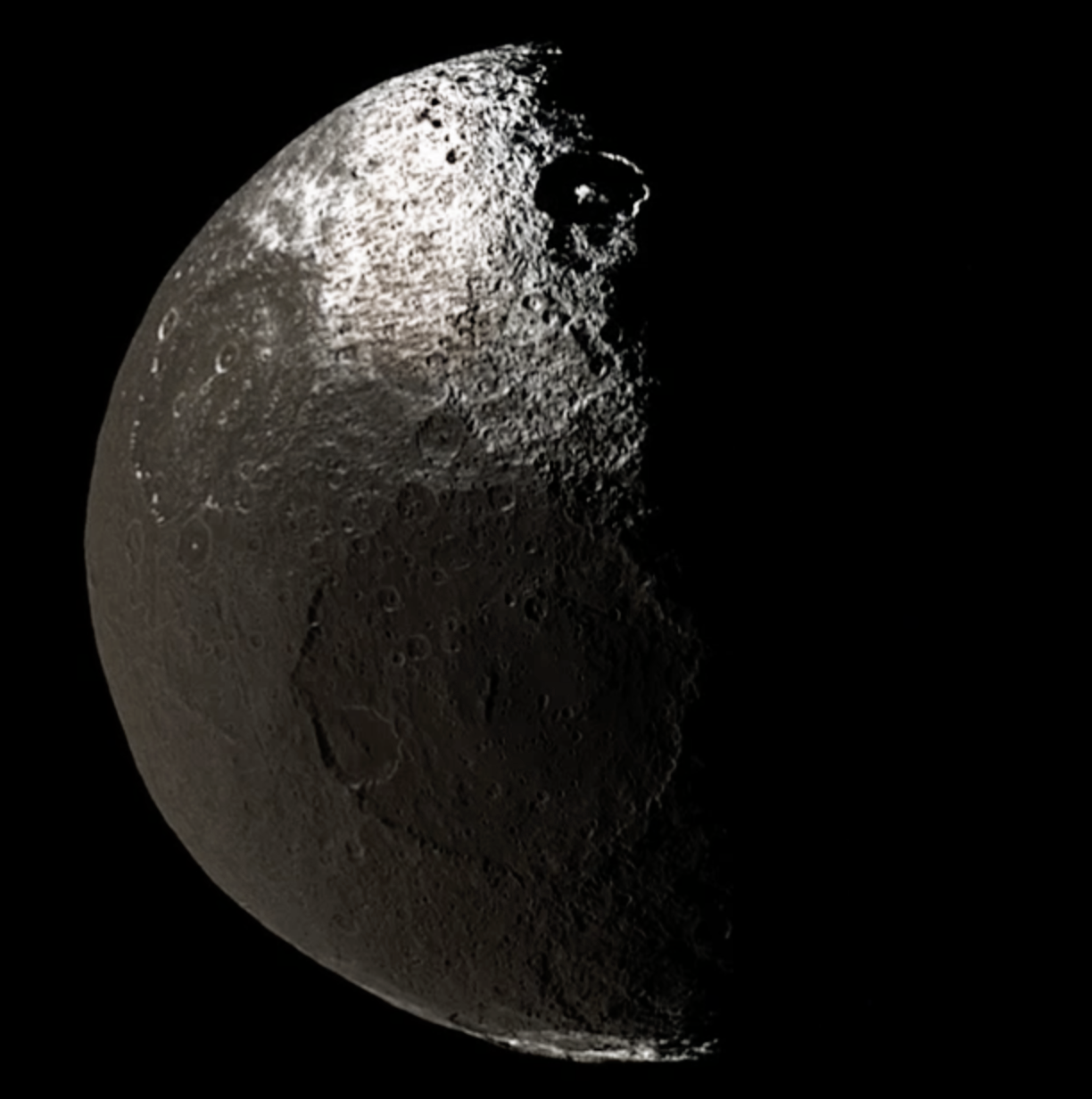
- Image of Iapetus. Falsaron is located at the upper-left, bordering the bright region Roncevaux Terra.
- Feature type: Impact basin
- Location: Iapetus
- Coordinates: 33.80°N 82.60°W
- Diameter: 422±22 km
- Depth: 10.5±4.4 km
- Eponym: Character from the Song of Roland

Falsaron is a large impact basin located on Saturn's outermost major moon Iapetus. Informally given the provisional designation of basin IV early in the study of Iapetus's topography, the name Falsaron was adopted by the International Astronomical Union (IAU) on 5 August 2008, after the brother of King Marsilion in the Song of Roland.

Falsaron is roughly 420 kilometres (260 mi) in diameter, with a depth of around 10 kilometres (6.2 mi). The nature of Falsaron's crater floor is ambiguous. In 2008, a team of researchers led by Bernd Giese argued that the crater floor features a broad, domed profile and lacks a central peak. A domed floor would be indicative of viscous relaxation, a process which results in a raised crater floor. However, a later team led by Guillaume Robuchon noted that Iapetus's topographical data lacks the resolution to confidently distinguish between domes and central peaks. Additionally, their models of Iapetian crater relaxation failed to produce domical uplift.

Falsaron partially covers an older impact basin about 800 kilometres (500 mi) in size; the impact event that created Falsaron likely destroyed the interior structure of the older, larger basin. Several linear features—likely secondary crater chains—radiate from Falsaron, crossing Iapetus's equatorial ridge.
