= Engelier =

Crater on Iapetus

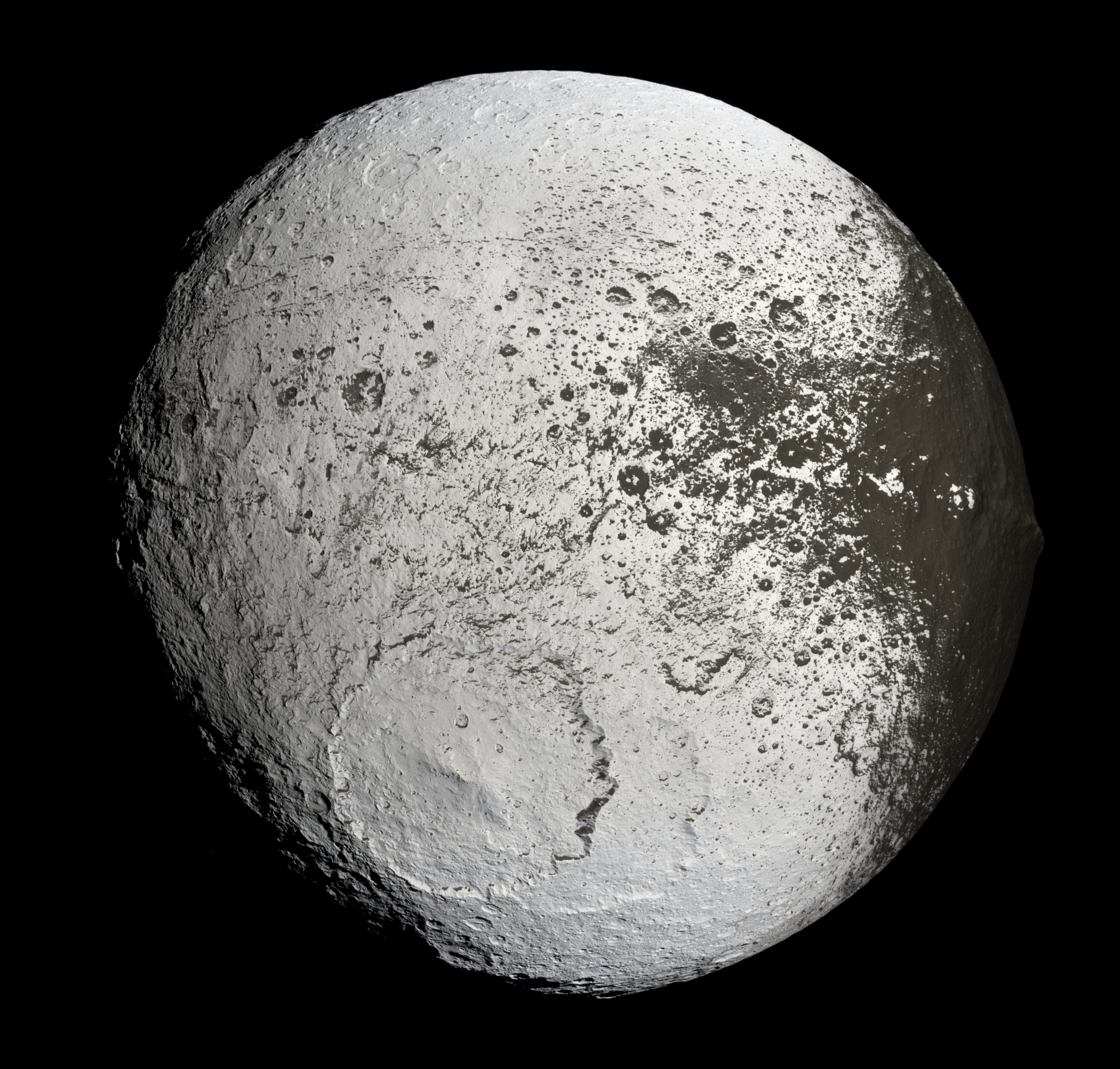
- Engelier (lower left) within Saragossa Terra.
- Feature type: Central peak impact basin
- Location: Saragossa Terra, Iapetus
- Coordinates: 40°30′S 96°42′E
- Diameter: 503 km (303 mi)
- Depth: 8-9 km
- Eponym: Engelier, character from the Song of Roland

Engelier is a 310-mile (500-kilometers) large crater on Saturn's moon Iapetus in Saragossa Terra. It partially obscures the slightly smaller crater Gerin.

== See also ==
- List of geological features on Iapetus
