= Saragossa Terra =

Feature on Iapetus

- Feature type: terra
- Location: Iapetus
- Coordinates: 45.0°S 180.0°W
- Diameter: 2300 km
- Discoverer: Cassini-Huygens spacecraft
- Eponym: Saragossa, Spain

Saragossa Terra is the name given to the southern part of the highly reflective half of Saturn's moon Iapetus. It is bordered on the north by Roncevaux Terra, and on both the east and west sides by Cassini Regio.

The largest named crater in Saragossa Terra is the 504-km-diameter Engelier. It partially obscures the slightly smaller crater Gerin. Both craters are named for paladins mentioned in The Song of Roland.
