= Equatorial ridge on Iapetus =

Terrain feature on Saturn's third-largest moon

Equatorial ridge Carcassone Montes Toledo Montes Tortelosa Montes
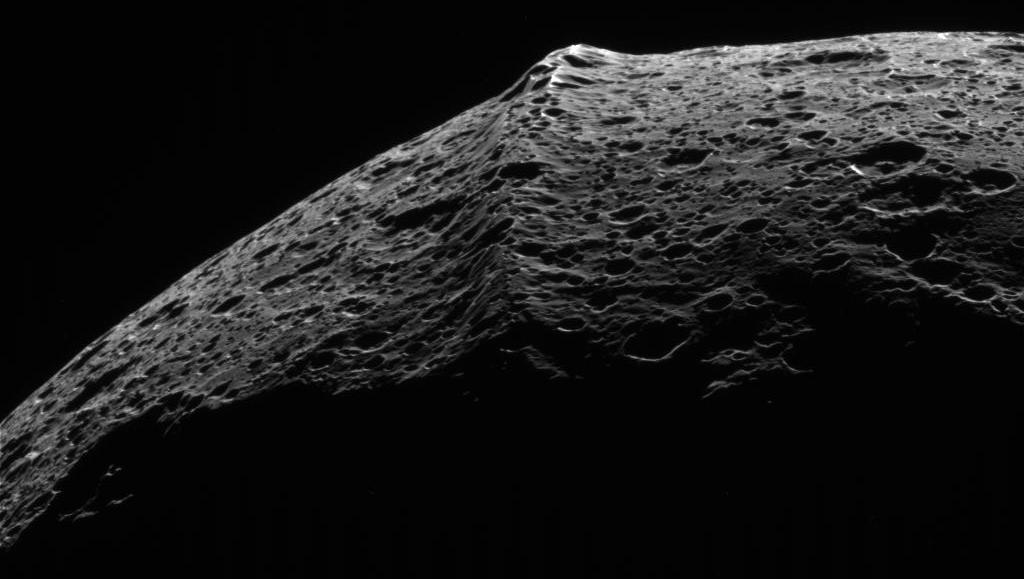
- Iapetus's equatorial ridge up close as imaged by Cassini
- Feature type: Mountains
- Location: Iapetus
- Coordinates: 0°N 0°W
- Length: 1,300 km (810 mi)
- Peak: 20 km (12 mi)
- Discoverer: Cassini

Iapetus, Saturn's third-largest moon, has a 20 kilometer (12 mi) tall equatorial ridge. The ridge runs along most of Iapetus's equator, and is the third tallest mountain structure in the Solar System. First discovered by the Cassini probe in 2004, the ridge's origin is unknown. The equatorial ridge is split into three mountain ranges, Carcassone Montes, Toledo Montes, and Tortelosa Montes. There are bright areas on the sides of the equatorial ridge near Iapetus' bright trailing hemisphere, which were visible in Voyager 2 and were nicknamed the "Voyager Mountains"; they were eventually formally named Carcassone Montes.

== Discovery ==
Iapetus's equatorial ridge was discovered when the Cassini spacecraft imaged Iapetus on 31 December 2004. Peaks in the ridge rise more than 20 km above the surrounding plains, making them some of the tallest mountains in the Solar System. The ridge forms a complex system including isolated peaks, segments of more than 200 km and sections with three near parallel ridges.

== Origins ==
Within the bright regions there is no ridge, but there are a series of isolated 10 km peaks along the equator. The ridge system is heavily cratered, indicating that it is ancient. The prominent equatorial bulge gives Iapetus a walnut-like appearance.

It is not clear how the ridge formed. One difficulty is to explain why it follows the equator almost perfectly. There are at least four current hypotheses, but none of them explains why the ridge is confined to Cassini Regio.

- A team of scientists associated with the Cassini mission have argued that the ridge could be a remnant of the oblate shape of the young Iapetus, when it was rotating more rapidly than it does today. The height of the ridge suggests a maximum rotational period of 17 hours. If Iapetus cooled fast enough to preserve the ridge but remained plastic long enough for the tides raised by Saturn to have slowed the rotation to its current tidally locked 79 days, Iapetus must have been heated by the radioactive decay of aluminium-26. This isotope appears to have been abundant in the solar nebula from which Saturn formed, but has since virtually all decayed. The quantities of aluminium-26 needed to heat Iapetus to the required temperature give a tentative date to its formation relative to the rest of the Solar System: Iapetus must have come together earlier than expected, only two million years after the asteroids started to form.
- The ridge could be icy material that welled up from beneath the surface and then solidified. If it had formed away from the position of the equator at the time, this hypothesis requires that the rotational axis would have been driven to its current position by the ridge.
- Iapetus may have had a ring system during its formation due to its large Hill sphere, and the equatorial ridge could have then been produced by collisional accretion of this ring.
- Iapetus could have been impacted by a body that created both a ring system and a subsatellite, which would be possible due to the large Hill sphere mentioned above. The subsatellite then proceeds to quickly force the ring system down onto Iapetus, creating the ridge system, before escaping Iapetus' gravity via tidal acceleration.
- The ridge and the bulge could be the result of ancient convective overturn. This hypothesis states that the bulge is in isostatic equilibrium typical for terrestrial mountains. It means that under the bulge there is material of low density (roots). The weight of the bulge is compensated by buoyancy forces acting on the roots. The ridge is also built of less dense matter. Its position along the equator is probably a result of the Coriolis force acting on a liquid interior of Iapetus.

== Gallery ==
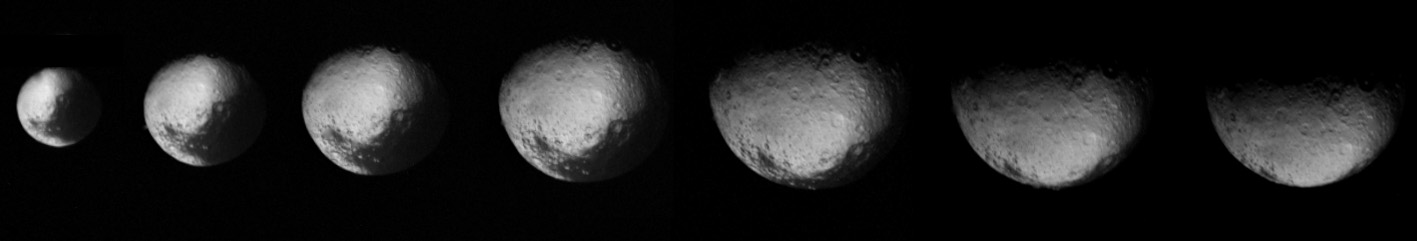
This series of images of Iapetus' north pole by Voyager 2 became the first-ever hints on the existence of the moon's equatorial ridge. The white and grey dots below each images (Iapetus' equator) will later be revealed to be Carcassone Montes (Voyager Montes) by Cassini. Taken on August 22, 1981.

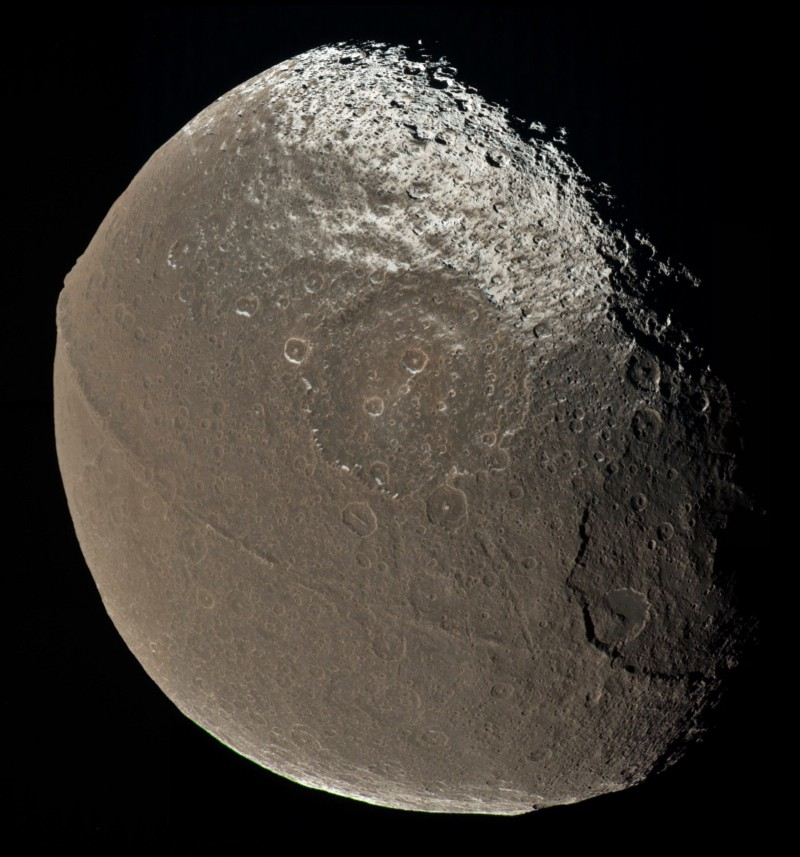
A global view of Iapetus obtained by the Cassini spacecraft on Dec. 31, 2004 - the first-ever clear image of the ridge - at a distance of about 172,900 kilometers (107,435 miles). The massive structure clearly distorts the shape of the moon at the equator.

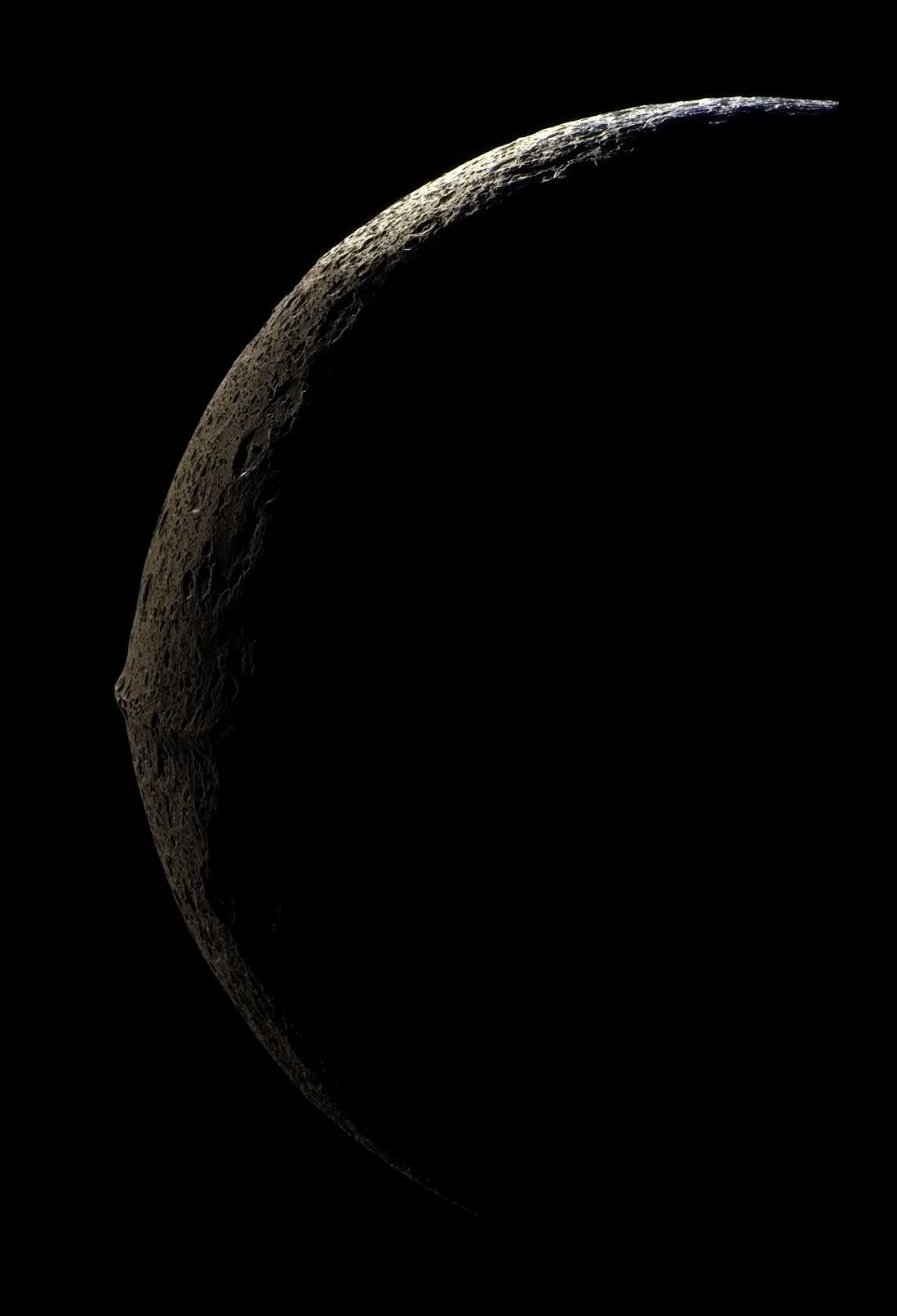
Iapetus' massive equatorial ridge is clearly visible from Cassini's images as the space probe approached Iapetus from its nightside during its closest flyby of the moon on September 10, 2007 at a distance of 83,000 kilometers (51,600 miles). The spacecraft came as close as 1,227 km (762 mi) from the moon's surface during this flyby. This is also the clearest picture of the equatorial ridge to date.
