= Roncevaux Terra =

Region of Iapetus

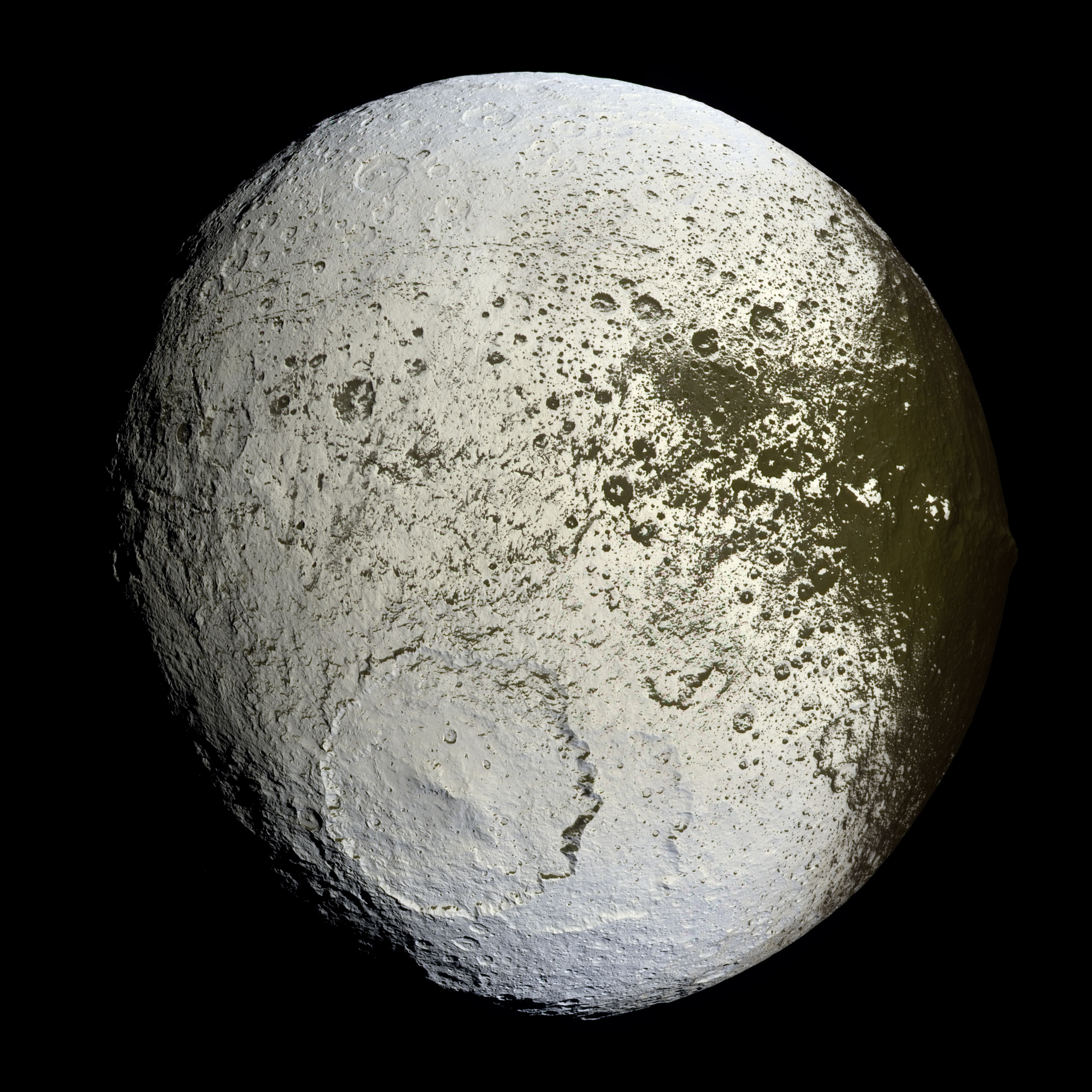
Roncevaux Terra (with part of Cassini Regio at right) can be seen in the upper half of the image.

Roncevaux Terra is the name given to the northern part of the highly reflective side of Saturn's moon Iapetus. The southern half of this side is named Saragossa Terra. The other half of Iapetus, named Cassini Regio, is extremely dark. It is believed that Roncevaux Terra's colour is the underlying colour of Iapetus, while Cassini Regio was formed either by a substance that has covered up the brighter ice of the rest of the moon, or by a residue left from the sublimation of Roncevaux-type water ice.

Roncevaux Terra is named after the Battle of Roncevaux Pass, subject of the French epic poem the Chanson de Roland, after whose characters the surface features of Iapetus are named. (Note: Terra" is a term used in planetary geology to refer to extensive landmasses.)
