= Cassini Regio =

Regio on Iapetus

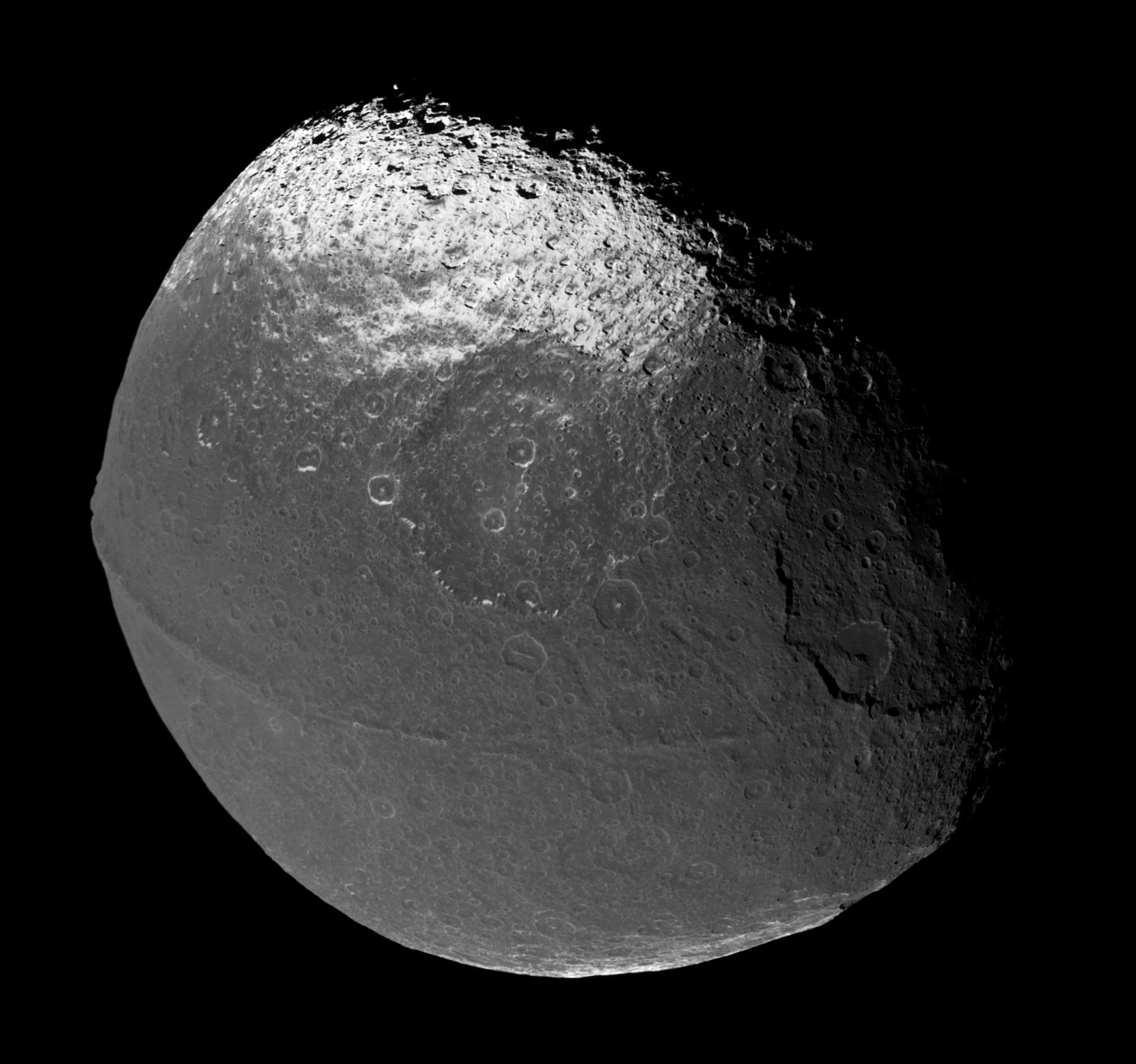
Photomosaic of Cassini images taken from 172,000 km (107,000 mi), showing the dark Cassini Regio, large craters, and the newly discovered equatorial ridge

Cassini Regio /kəˈsiːni ˈriːdʒioʊ/ (adjective Cassinian /kəˈsɪniən/) is the enigmatic dark area that covers the leading half of Saturn's moon Iapetus. It is named after Giovanni Cassini, the discoverer of Iapetus; 'Regio' is a term used in planetary geology for a large area that is strongly differentiated in colour or albedo from its surroundings. The brighter half of Iapetus is composed of the Roncevaux Terra and the Saragossa Terra.

The nature of the material that caused the extensive discoloration of Cassini Regio is not known, but it appears to be quite thin. It may be the result of cryovolcanism, a spattering of material from outer moons, or residue left by the sublimation of brighter ice.

In December 2004 an image taken by the NASA Cassini probe revealed that a 1,300 km (810 mi) long ridge of 20 km (12 mi) high mountains runs down the centre of Cassini Regio, almost perfectly following Iapetus's equator. The origin of this extremely unusual feature is as yet unknown.

Cassini completed a 1,000 km (620 mi) flyby of Iapetus in September 2007, and the images it has transmitted are helping to clarify the nature of Cassini Regio. For more details, see the main article on Iapetus.
