= List of geological features on Vesta =

This is a list of named geological features, of various kinds, on asteroid 4 Vesta.

== Catenae ==
Crater	Pronounced	Coordinates	Diameter (km)	Approval date	Named after	Ref.
Albalonga Catena	/ælbəˈlɒŋɡə/	7.17°S 72.61°E	161.74	21 Nov 2012	Alba Longa	WGPSN
Robigalia Catena	/rɒbɪˈɡeɪliə/	14.04°S 19.78°E	79.21	21 Nov 2012	Robigalia	WGPSN

== Craters ==
Crater	Pronounced	Coordinates	Diameter (km)	Approval date	Named after	Ref.
Aconia	/əˈkoʊniə/	7.54°N 151.37°E	19.00	5 Feb 2014	Aconia Fabia Paulina	WGPSN
Aelia	/eɪˈiːliə/	14.26°S 290.80°E	4.34	28 Feb 2012	Aelia Oculata	WGPSN
Africana	/æfrɪˈkeɪnə/	68.99°N 345.87°E	25.43	5 Feb 2014	Cornelia Africana	WGPSN
Albana	/ælˈbeɪnə/	76.61°N 200.69°E	90.86	21 Nov 2012	Albana	WGPSN
Albia	/ˈælbiə/	27.85°S 78.85°E	5.79	5 Feb 2014	Albia Dominica	WGPSN
Alypia	/əˈlɪpiə/	70.22°S 139.22°E	15.17	5 Feb 2014	Alypia (ἀλῡπία)	WGPSN
Angioletta	/ˌændʒioʊˈlɛtə/	40.16°S 179.25°E	18.42	7 Oct 2014	Angioletta Coradini	WGPSN
Antonia	/ænˈtoʊniə/	58.70°S 350.78°E	16.75	28 Feb 2012	Antonia	WGPSN
Aquilia	/əˈkwɪliə/	49.41°S 190.88°E	36.82	28 Feb 2012	Julia Aquilia Severa	WGPSN
Arruntia	/əˈrʌnʃiə/	39.44°N 221.59°E	10.49	28 Feb 2012	Arruntia	WGPSN
Bellicia	/bɪˈlɪʃiə/	37.73°N 197.76°E	41.68	30 Sep 2011	Bellicia	WGPSN
Bruttia	/ˈbrʌtʃiə/	63.81°N 237.09°E	20.68	5 Feb 2014	Bruttia Crispina	WGPSN
Caesonia	/sɪˈzoʊniə/	31.20°N 249.93°E	104.23	5 Feb 2014	Atia	WGPSN
Calpurnia	/kælˈpɜːrniə/	16.72°N 349.10°E	50.19	27 Dec 2011	Calpurnia	WGPSN
Cannutia	/kəˈnjuːʃiə/	58.93°S 214.73°E	17.96	5 Feb 2014	Cannutia	WGPSN
Canuleia	/kænjʊˈliːə/	33.62°S 84.52°E	11.32	28 Feb 2012	Canuleia	WGPSN
Caparronia	/kæpəˈroʊniə/	35.71°N 317.03°E	53.20	30 Sep 2011	Caparronia	WGPSN
Charito	/ˈkærɪtoʊ/	44.80°S 90.71°E	6.55	5 Feb 2014	Charito	WGPSN
Claudia	/ˈklɔːdiə/	1.65°S 146.00°E	0.57	5 Feb 2014	Claudia	WGPSN
Coelia	/ˈsiːliə/	1.14°S 239.82°E	14.06	5 Feb 2014	Coelia Concordia	WGPSN
Cornelia	/kɔːrˈniːliə/	9.37°S 15.57°E	14.90	27 Dec 2011	Cornelia	WGPSN
Cossinia	/kɒˈsɪniə/	0.63°N 178.96°E	15.72	5 Feb 2014	Cossinia	WGPSN
Domitia	(add pronunciation)	37.62°N 337.96°E	32.99	30 Sep 2011	Roman vestal virgin	WGPSN
Domna	/ˈdɒmnə/	11.11°S 225.93°E	13.53	21 Nov 2012	Julia Domna	WGPSN
Drusilla	/druːˈsɪlə/	15.05°S 51.22°E	20.34	28 Feb 2012	Julia Drusilla	WGPSN
Eumachia	/juːˈmeɪkiə/	0.14°N 317.06°E	25.78	21 Nov 2012	Eumachia	WGPSN
Eusebia	/juːˈsiːbiə/	42.04°S 354.31°E	23.44	28 Feb 2012	Eusebia	WGPSN
Eutropia	/juːˈtroʊpiə/	22.40°N 255.01°E	21.09	21 Nov 2012	Eutropia	WGPSN
Fabia	/ˈfeɪbiə/	15.53°N 55.76°E	11.62	28 Feb 2012	Fabia	WGPSN
Fausta	/ˈfɔːstə/	25.44°S 99.76°E	3.14	5 Feb 2014	Flavia Maxima Fausta	WGPSN
Flavola	/ˈflævələ/	9.16°S 329.56°E	2.87	5 Feb 2014	Flavola	WGPSN
Floronia	/fləˈroʊniə/	36.23°N 94.06°E	18.54	30 Sep 2011	Floronia	WGPSN
Fonteia	/fɒnˈtiːə/	53.25°S 291.41°E	20.61	21 Nov 2012	Fonteia	WGPSN
Fulvia	/ˈfʌlviə/	26.13°S 292.65°E	16.73	5 Feb 2014	Fulvia	WGPSN
Fundania	/fənˈdeɪniə/	57.62°N 285.02°E	29.23	5 Feb 2014	Annia Fundania Faustina	WGPSN
Galeria	/ɡəˈlɪəriə/	29.82°S 18.38°E	21.77	21 Nov 2012	Galeria Fundana	WGPSN
Gegania	/dʒɪˈɡeɪniə/	4.05°N 210.77°E	22.34	30 Sep 2011	Gegania	WGPSN
Graecina	/ɡriːˈsaɪnə/	37.45°S 237.01°E	11.93	5 Feb 2014	Pomponia Graecina	WGPSN
Helena	/ˈhɛlɪnə/	41.51°S 272.55°E	22.06	27 Dec 2011	Flavia Iulia Helena Augusta	WGPSN
Herennia	/hɪˈrɛniə/	72.42°S 10.33°E	22.34	5 Feb 2014	Herennia Etruscilla	WGPSN
Hortensia	/hɔːrˈtɛnsiə/	46.85°S 165.38°E	29.45	7 Oct 2014	Hortensia	WGPSN
Iunia	(stress the 'u') (Note: In modern Latin orthography, this name is spelled 'Junia', and pronounced /ˈdʒuːniə/ in English. Because the name of the crater is spelled with an 'I', it might instead be /aɪˈjuːniə/ in English. (Cf. Iapetus vs Japetus.))	35.58°S 238.22°E	3.03	5 Feb 2014	Iunia	WGPSN
Justina	/dʒʌˈstaɪnə/	34.41°S 107.88°E	7.62	28 Feb 2012	Justina	WGPSN
Laelia	/ˈliːliə/	46.82°S 290.45°E	8.89	28 Feb 2012	Laelia	WGPSN
Laeta	/ˈliːtə/	14.90°N 329.90°E	1.36	5 Feb 2014	Clodia Laeta	WGPSN
Laurentia	/lɒˈrɛnʃiə/	28.15°S 92.80°E	11.48	5 Feb 2014	Acca Larentia	WGPSN
Lepida	/ˈlɛpɪdə/	16.74°N 96.76°E	42.90	28 Feb 2012	Lepida	WGPSN
Licinia	/lɪˈsɪniə/	23.34°N 167.35°E	24.05	28 Feb 2012	Licinia	WGPSN
Lollia	/ˈlɒliə/	37.36°S 242.33°E	4.90	5 Feb 2014	Lollia Paulina	WGPSN
Longina	/lɒnˈdʒaɪnə/	36.96°N 20.65°E	17.65	5 Feb 2014	Domitia Longina	WGPSN
Lucilla	/luːˈsɪlə/	75.96°S 299.12°E	19.30	5 Feb 2014	Annia Lucilla	WGPSN
Mamilia	/məˈmɪliə/	48.39°N 82.09°E	35.67	21 Nov 2012	Mamilia	WGPSN
Marcia	/ˈmɑːrʃə/	8.98°N 339.55°E	67.60	30 Sep 2011	Marcia	WGPSN
Mariamne	/mæriˈæmniː/	68.44°S 350.73°E	30.33	5 Feb 2014	Mariamne	WGPSN
Metrodora	/mɛtrəˈdoʊrə/	59.43°S 100.54°E	23.99	5 Feb 2014	Claudia Metrodora	WGPSN
Minervina	/mɪnərˈvaɪnə/	16.85°N 199.29°E	18.34	5 Feb 2014	Minervina	WGPSN
Minucia	/mɪˈnjuːʃiə/	20.20°N 357.20°E	23.15	27 Dec 2011	Minucia	WGPSN
Myia	/ˈmaɪə/	50.53°S 256.34°E	2.58	21 Nov 2012	Myia	WGPSN
Numisia	/njuːˈmɪʃiə/	7.48°S 37.25°E	29.94	30 Sep 2011	Numisia	WGPSN
Occia	/ˈɒkʃiə/	15.47°S 168.48°E	7.34	28 Feb 2012	Occia	WGPSN
Octavia	/ɒkˈteɪviə/	3.30°S 297.21°E	30.62	28 Feb 2012	Octavia	WGPSN
Oppia	/ˈɒpiə/	7.89°S 99.08°E	36.67	30 Sep 2011	Oppia	WGPSN
Paculla	/pəˈkʌlə/	64.22°S 151.15°E	22.34	5 Feb 2014	Paculla Annia	WGPSN
Paulina	/pɔːˈlaɪnə/	10.92°N 133.11°E	18.13	21 Nov 2012	Aurelia Paulina	WGPSN
Perpennia	/pərˈpɛniə/	23.03°S 258.75°E	21.36	5 Feb 2014	Perpennia	WGPSN
Pinaria	/pɪˈnɛəriə/	29.54°S 181.63°E	41.76	30 Sep 2011	Pinaria	WGPSN
Placidia	/pləˈsɪdiə/	19.24°N 281.38°E	14.75	5 Feb 2014	Galla Placidia	WGPSN
Plancia	/ˈplænʃiə/	61.56°N 343.91°E	18.48	5 Feb 2014	Plancia Magna	WGPSN
Pomponia	/pɒmˈpoʊniə/	70.20°N 262.58°E	59.07	21 Nov 2012	Pomponia	WGPSN
Portia	/ˈpɔːrʃə/	0.91°N 191.17°E	11.44	5 Feb 2014	Porcia Catonis	WGPSN
Postumia	/pɒˈstjuːmiə/	33.84°N 33.77°E	195.89	5 Feb 2014	Postumia	WGPSN
Publicia	/pəˈblɪʃiə/	14.53°N 234.36°E	15.79	28 Feb 2012	Flavia Publicia	WGPSN
Rheasilvia	/ˌriːəˈsɪlviə/	71.95°S 86.30°E	450.00	30 Sep 2011	Rhea Silvia	WGPSN
Rubria	/ˈruːbriə/	7.32°S 168.34°E	10.27	28 Feb 2012	Rubria	WGPSN
Rufillia	/ruːˈfɪliə/	12.92°S 288.71°E	15.79	28 Feb 2012	Rufillia	WGPSN
Scantia	/ˈskænʃiə/	29.63°N 64.65°E	18.61	28 Feb 2012	Scantia	WGPSN
Sentia	/ˈsɛnʃiə/	38.39°S 170.75°E	16.54	7 Oct 2014	Amaesia Sentia	WGPSN
Serena	/sɪˈriːnə/	20.43°S 270.71°E	18.47	28 Feb 2012	Serena	WGPSN
Severina	/sɛvəˈraɪnə/	75.41°S 271.55°E	34.74	27 Dec 2011	Severina	WGPSN
Sextilia	/sɛksˈtɪliə/	39.00°S 295.93°E	19.48	30 Sep 2011	Sextilia	WGPSN
Sossia	/ˈsɒsiə/	36.78°S 75.76°E	8.11	28 Feb 2012	Sossia	WGPSN
Tarpeia	/tɑːrˈpiːə/	69.47°S 179.30°E	40.29	27 Dec 2011	Tarpeia	WGPSN
Teia	/ˈtiːə/	3.44°S 61.06°E	6.69	28 Feb 2012	Teia Euphrosyne Ruffina	WGPSN
Torquata	/tɔːrˈkweɪtə/	46.45°N 143.78°E	34.73	21 Nov 2012	Torquata	WGPSN
Tuccia	/ˈtʌkʃiə/	39.86°S 346.81°E	11.64	30 Sep 2011	Tuccia	WGPSN
Urbinia	/ɜːrˈbɪniə/	29.88°S 66.26°E	24.25	30 Sep 2011	Urbinia	WGPSN
Varronilla	/værəˈnɪlə/	29.62°N 179.58°E	158.45	5 Feb 2014	Varronilla	WGPSN
Veneneia	/vɛnɪˈniːə/	47.93°S 305.68°E	400.00	28 Feb 2012	Veneneia	WGPSN
Vettenia	/vɪˈtɛniə/	4.80°N 229.31°E	18.89	5 Feb 2014	Vettenia	WGPSN
Vibidia	/vɪˈbɪdiə/	26.96°S 10.30°E	7.10	27 Dec 2011	Vibidia	WGPSN

== Dorsa ==
Crater	Pronounced	Coordinates	Diameter (km)	Approval date	Named after	Ref.
Lavinium Dorsa	/ləˈvɪniəm/	27.15°N 109.15°E	96.35	21 November 2012	Lavinium	WGPSN
Neptunalia Dorsa	/nɛptjuːˈneɪliə/	45.14°S 80.75°E	83.13	5 February 2014	Neptunalia	WGPSN
Parilia Dorsae	/pəˈrɪliə/	56.71°S 123.84°E	79.65	5 February 2014	Parilia	WGPSN

== Fossae ==
Crater	Pronounced	Coordinates	Diameter (km)	Approval date	Named after	Ref.
Divalia Fossae	/dɪˈveɪliə/	9.05°S 196.23°E	549.37	27 December 2011	Divalia	WGPSN
Lupercalia Fossa	/luːpərˈkeɪliə/	10.33°N 242.6°E	82.28	5 February 2014	Lupercalia	WGPSN
Saturnalia Fossae	/sætərˈneɪliə/	28.05°N 37.05°E	344.94	27 December 2011	Saturnalia	WGPSN

== Planitiae ==
Crater	Pronounced	Coordinates	Diameter (km)	Approval date	Named after	Ref.
Feralia Planitia	/fɪˈreɪliə/	3.03°N 101.71°E	270.27	27 December 2011	Feralia	WGPSN

== Rupes ==
Crater	Pronounced	Coordinates	Diameter (km)	Approval date	Named after	Ref.
Agonium Rupes	/əˈɡoʊniəm/	53.47°S 316.08°E	111.28	27 December 2011	Agonium	WGPSN
Matronalia Rupes	/mætrəˈneɪliə/	49.42°S 232.76°E	209.49	27 December 2011	Matronalia	WGPSN
Parentatio Rupes	/pærənˈteɪʃioʊ/	73.75°S 107.59°E	99.34	5 February 2014	Parentatio	WGPSN

== Terrae ==
Crater	Pronounced	Coordinates	Diameter (km)	Approval date	Named after	Ref.
Vestalia Terra	/vɛˈsteɪliə/	3.73°S 33.47°E	335.56	27 December 2011	Vestalia	WGPSN

== Tholi ==
Crater	Pronounced	Coordinates	Diameter (km)	Approval date	Named after	Ref.
Aricia Tholus	/əˈrɪʃiə/	13.38°N 311.55°E	39.02	27 December 2011	Aricia	WGPSN
Brumalia Tholus	/bruːˈmeɪliə/	6.31°S 64.99°E	48.21	21 November 2012	Brumalia	WGPSN
Lucaria Tholus	/luːˈkɛəriə/	12.9°S 253.65°E	24.75	30 September 2011	Lucaria	WGPSN
