= List of quadrangles on Vesta =

The surface of Vesta has been divided into 15 quadrangles or sections.

Name	Number	Latitude	Longitude	Ref
Albana	Av1	65-90° N	0-360° W	
Bellicia	Av2	21-66° N	0-90° W	
Caparronia	Av3	21-66° N	90-180° W	
Domitia	Av4	21-66° N	180-270° W	
Floronia	Av5	21-66° N	270-360° W	
Gegania	Av6	22° N-22° S	0-72° W	
Lucaria	Av7	22° N-22° S	72-144° W	
Marcia	Av8	22° N-22° S	144-216° W	
Numisia	Av9	22° N-22° S	216-288° W	
Oppia	Av10	22° N-22° S	288-360° W	
Pinaria	Av11	21-66° S	0-90° W	
Sextilia	Av12	21-66° S	90-180° W	
Tuccia	Av13	21-66° S	180-270° W	
Urbinia	Av14	21-66° S	270-360° W	
Rheasilvia	Av15	65-90° S	0-360° W	

== See also ==
- List of geological features on Vesta
- List of largest craters in the Solar System
