= Feralia Planitia =

3rd largest crater on asteroid 4 Vesta

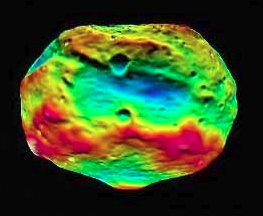
- Feralia Planitia (green and blue, center), an old, degraded crater near Vesta's equator. It is 270 km across and predates Rheasilvia (green at bottom)
- Feature type: Plains, impact basin
- Location: 4 Vesta
- Coordinates: 3°2′N 101°43′E
- Length: 270 km (170 mi)
- Depth: 5–7 km (3.1–4.3 mi) (northern rim) 14 km (8.7 mi) (southern rim)
- Discoverer: Hubble Space Telescope
- Eponym: Feralia

Feralia Planitia (/fəˈreɪliə pləˈnɪʃiə/) is an elongated, rugged basin on the asteroid Vesta. It is the asteroid's third-largest known impact structure, after Rheasilvia and Veneneia. It is one of several old, degraded impact basins that predate the Rheasilvia basin that now dominates Vesta. It is situated near the equator, and is 270 kilometres (170 mi) across east to west, though compressed latitudinally by the Rheasilvia impact.

== Observation and naming ==
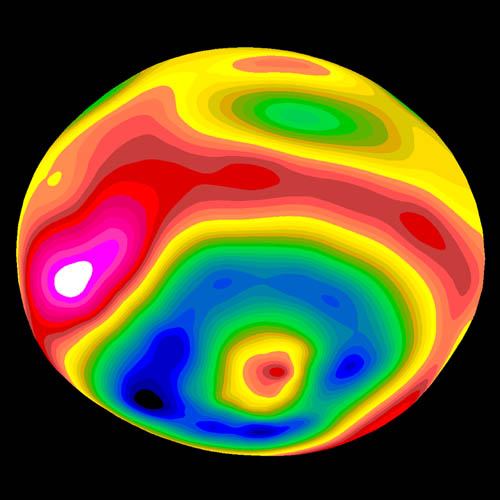
Feralia Planitia (green, top) is large enough to be visible from Earth, here as seen in a model of Vesta constructed from Hubble Space Telescope images taken in May 1996. The much larger crater at the bottom is Rheasilvia

Feralia Planitia was first seen in distant observations of Vesta by the Hubble Space Telescope (HST), which observed Vesta in 1994, 1996, 2007, and 2010. Feralia Planitia was given the informal provisional designation of Feature Y. Feralia Planitia, alongside Vesta's other surface features, were resolved in detail for the first time by the Dawn orbiter, which orbited Vesta from 16 July 2011 to 4 September 2012. The feature was officially named after the ancient Roman public festival of Feralia, where citizens would place offerings at the tombs of the dead. The name "Feralia Planitia" was approved by the International Astronomical Union (IAU) on 27 December 2011.

== Geology and characteristics ==
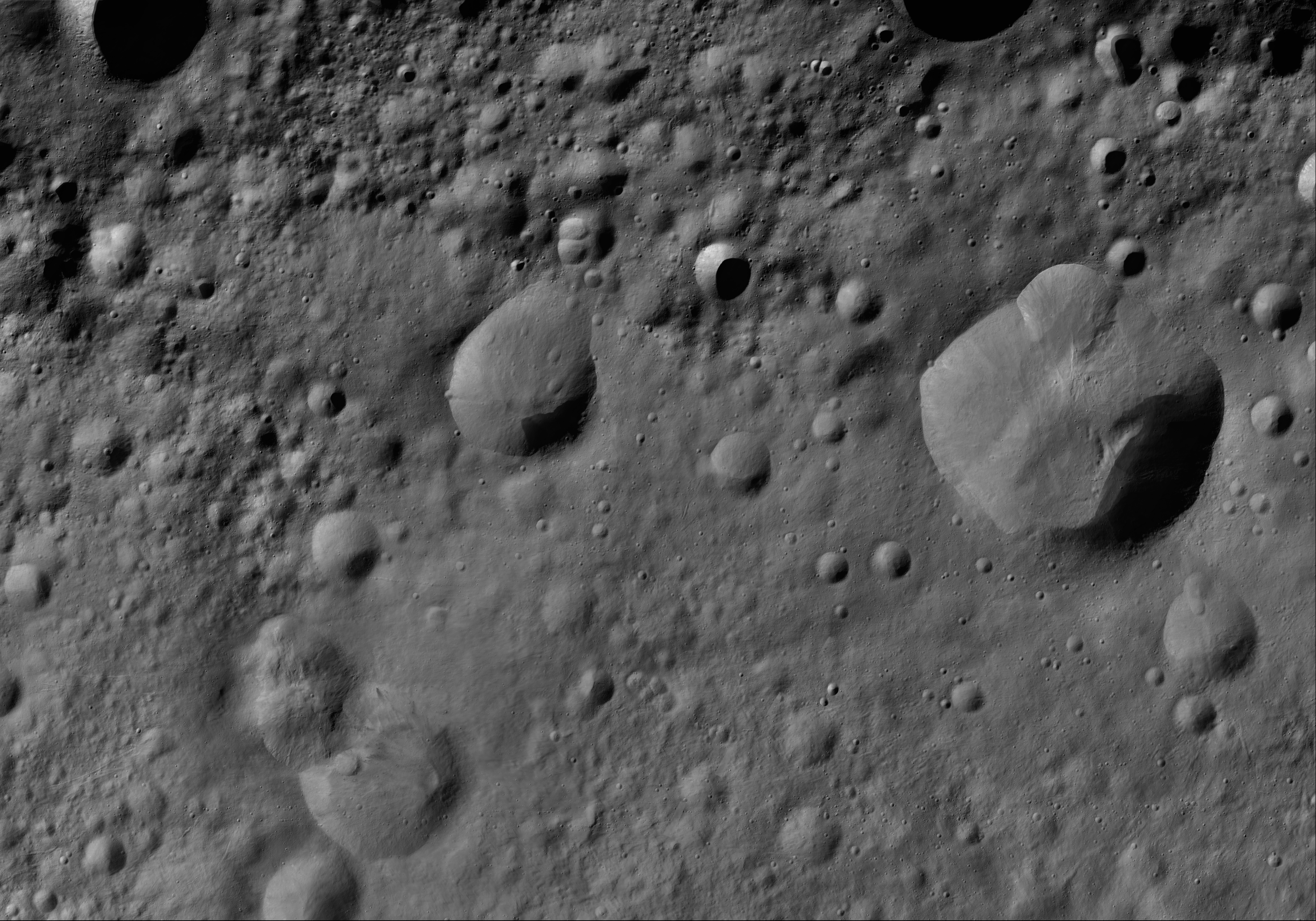
An image of the Lepida Quadrangle on Vesta, including the far northwestern corner of Feralia Planitia. Lepida is located at right, whilst Vestalia Terra is located at lower left

Feralia Planitia, located near the equator, dominates Vesta's eastern hemisphere. The basin is roughly ellipsoidal and elongated east to west and very roughly spans 130 by 300 kilometers. Feralia Planitia is surrounded by elevated terrain, with the northern rim dropping roughly 5–7 kilometers and the southern rim dropping by up to 14 kilometers. It borders the cratered highlands of Vestalia Terra to the west, the rim of Rheasilvia to the south, Divalia Fossae to the east, and Saturnalia Fossae to the northwest. Two major impact craters further alter Feralia Planitia's rim: the ~45 km Lepida on the northern wall, and the ~35–40 km Oppia on the southern wall.

Feralia Planitia is likely an ancient, degraded impact basin, though whether it was formed by a single impact event or multiple remains unclear. The surrounding cratered highlands likely represent ejecta blasted out by the impact event(s) that created Feralia Planitia. Meanwhile, he interior of Feralia Planitia is comparatively unmodified by the extensive troughs of Divalia Fossae and Saturnalia Fossae, though some of their troughs extend into the walls of Feralia Planitia, indicating that they are younger than the basin. As Divalia Fossae and Saturnalia Fossae are similar in age to the Rheasilvia and Veneneia impact basins, this indicates that both the trough systems and the two major southern impact basins are younger than Feralia Planitia. However, a precise date for Feralia Planitia's formation cannot be determined through crater counting, as the basin underwent a resurfacing event roughly 3.62 billion years ago. Feralia Planitia's surface is partially composed of eucrites, a type of basaltic rock containing anorthite, calcium-poor pyroxene, and augite. This is in contrast to the older northern and northeastern highlands, whose mineralogy is dominated by howardite, a mixture of eucrite and diogenite. Feralia Planitia is the site of a negative gravity anomaly.
