= Lists of geological features of the Solar System =

This is a directory of lists of geological features on planets including Earth, moons and asteroids ordered by increasing distance from the Sun. Bodies in a planetary system are ordered similarly.

== Mercury ==
- List of craters on Mercury
- List of geological features on Mercury

== Venus ==
- List of craters on Venus
- List of coronae on Venus
- List of mountains on Venus
- List of terrae on Venus

== Earth ==
- see also Geology, Plate tectonics, Geologic eras, Geological history of Earth

=== The Moon ===
- List of craters on the Moon
- List of maria on the Moon
- List of mountains on the Moon
- List of valleys on the Moon

== Mars ==
- List of craters on Mars
- List of mountains on Mars
- List of rocks on Mars
- List of valles on Mars
- List of chasmata on Mars
- List of plains on Mars
- List of terrae on Mars
- List of areas of chaos terrain on Mars
- List of surface features of Mars seen by the Spirit rover
- List of surface features of Mars seen by the Opportunity rover
- see also List of Martian canals

== Asteroids ==
- List of geological features on Ceres
- List of geological features on Vesta
- List of geological features on 243 Ida and Dactyl
- List of craters on 253 Mathilde
- List of geological features on 433 Eros
- List of geological features on 951 Gaspra
- List of geological features on 25143 Itokawa

== Jupiter ==
=== Io ===
- List of mountains on Io
- List of volcanic features on Io
- List of regions on Io

=== Europa ===
- List of craters on Europa
- List of lineae on Europa
- List of geological features on Europa

=== Ganymede ===
- List of craters on Ganymede
- List of geological features on Ganymede

=== Callisto ===
- List of craters on Callisto
- List of geological features on Callisto

== Saturn ==
- List of geological features on Mimas
- List of geological features on Enceladus
- List of geological features on Tethys
- List of geological features on Dione
- List of geological features on Rhea
- List of geological features on Titan
- List of geological features on Hyperion
- List of geological features on Iapetus
- List of geological features on Phoebe

== Uranus ==
- List of geological features on Puck
- List of geological features on Miranda
- List of geological features on Ariel
- List of geological features on Umbriel
- List of geological features on Titania
- List of geological features on Oberon

== Neptune ==
- List of geological features on Proteus
- List of geological features on Triton

== Kuiper belt ==
- List of geological features on Pluto
- List of geological features on Charon

== See also ==
- Lists of astronomical objects
- Geology of solar terrestrial planets
- Planetary nomenclature
- Planetary geology
- List of extraterrestrial dune fields
- List of tallest mountains in the Solar System
- List of craters in the Solar System
- List of largest craters in the Solar System
- List of largest rifts, canyons and valleys in the Solar System
