= P. lepida =

P. lepida may refer to:

- Parasa lepida, the nettle caterpillar or blue-striped nettle grub, a moth species found in India, Sri Lanka, Vietnam, Malaysia and Indonesia
- Pyrrhura lepida, the pearly parakeet or pearly conure, a parrot species endemic to east Amazonian forests in Brazil

== See also ==
- Lepida (disambiguation)
