= List of largest lakes and seas in the Solar System =

Listed below are the largest ocean, lakes and seas in the Solar System and beyond includes single bodies of water or other liquid on or near the surface of a solid round body (terrestrial planet, dwarf planet, or moon).

Currently, cold surface bodies of liquid are found on two worlds in the Solar System, Earth and Saturn's moon Titan. Earth is the only planet with liquid water on its surface. The other "oceans" are found under thick covers of surface ice. If both liquid and frozen water are counted, Earth ranks fifth in volume of its oceans. Recent studies indicate a large underground saltwater ocean present on Ganymede, Jupiter’s largest moon, with estimated water volume eight times greater than Earth’s world ocean.

The fourth largest of Jupiter’s moons, Europa, while smaller than Earth’s moon, ranks fourth in water volume, estimated to be twice as much as on Earth. Latest analysis using data from NASA’s James Webb Space Telescope indicates that the carbon dioxide found on the icy surface of Europa likely originated in the subsurface ocean which could potentially be habitable.

Scientists predict "oceans" beneath the ice of the Jupiter's moon Callisto's cratered surface and the south pole of Saturn's moon Enceladus. Saturn's moon Titan is also thought to have a salty subsurface ocean of water - as salty as the Dead Sea on Earth. Additionally, research suggests that Saturn's moon Mimas might be hiding a liquid water ocean beneath its impact-battered surface. A subsurface ocean at Neptune's moon Triton is considered possible as well. Mysterious fault lines on dwarf planet Pluto may suggest that it has a hidden subsurface ocean.

Lava lakes are found on Earth and Jupiter's moon Io. Subsurface oceans or seas are suspected to exist on some of Saturn's other moons, the asteroid Ceres, the larger trans-Neptunian objects, and ice planets in planetary systems.

Recent analysis of the interior of Ganymede suggests that it and some of the other icy bodies may not have a single interior global ocean but several stacked ones, separated by different phases of ice, with the lowest liquid layer adjacent to the rocky mantle below.

In June 2020, NASA scientists reported that it is likely that exoplanets with oceans may be common in the Milky Way galaxy, based on mathematical modeling studies of their internal heating rates. The majority of such worlds would probably have subsurface oceans, similar to those of the icy moons Europa and Enceladus.

== List ==
Largest known or predicted oceans, lakes and seas, with composition and dimensions, grouped by celestial body and sortable by size, depth, etc.
Body	Type of object	Liquid volume in zettaliters	Ocean/Lake/Sea	Composition	Location	Area (km^{2})	Average depth (km)	Image	Notes
Earth	planet (terrestrial)	1.362	World Ocean	salt water	surface, global	361,300,000	3.68 (max 11.02)		commonly divided into five regions 71% of Earth's surface Mass of 1.4 × 10^{18} tonnes
Earth	planet (terrestrial)	1.362	Caspian Sea	salt water	surface, Central Asia	389,000	0.21 (max 1.02)		Earth's largest inland body of surface liquid, endorheic (0.07% of Earth's surface)
Earth	planet (terrestrial)	1.362	Lake Michigan–Huron	fresh water	surface, North America	117,400	0.07 (max 0.28)		largest freshwater lake
Mars	planet (terrestrial)	?	south polar lakes? (not confirmed)	salt water or brine?	subglacial, south polar cap	c. 200	(shallow, > 0.2 m)		there may be additional such lakes
Io	moon of Jupiter	?	Gish Bar Patera	lava	surface	9,600	?		
Io	moon of Jupiter	?	Loki Patera	lava	surface	< 32,000	?		
Europa	moon of Jupiter	2.6	(internal global ocean)	water? water–ammonia mixture?	subsurface, global	c. 30,000,000	est. 50–100		global ocean under 10 to 30 km of ice, perhaps twice the volume of Earth's ocean
Ganymede	moon of Jupiter	35.4	(internal global ocean)	salt water?	subsurface, global	c. 80,000,000 apiece	100		100 km thick, under 150 km of ice, six times the volume of Earth's ocean; possibly three oceans, one under another
Callisto	moon of Jupiter	5.3	(internal global ocean)	water? water–ammonia mixture?	subsurface, global	c. 65,000,000	10		global ocean under 135 to 150 km of ice
Enceladus	moon of Saturn	0.01	(internal global ocean)	(salt?) water	subsurface, global	c. 650,000	26–31 or 38 ± 4		global ocean under 21–26 or 23 ± 4 km of ice, based on libration
Dione	moon of Saturn	0.14	(internal global ocean?)	water? water–ammonia mixture?	subsurface, global	c. 2,700,000	65 ± 30		global ocean under 99 ± 23 km of ice
Rhea	moon of Saturn	?	(internal global ocean?)	water? water–ammonia mixture?	subsurface, global	c. 1,000,000–2,000,000	c. 15		possible global ocean under the ice (c. 400 km) (Note: Possible depending on the degree of differentiation of the interior, which is uncertain.)
Titan	moon of Saturn	18.6	Kraken Mare	hydrocarbons	surface, north polar region	≈ 400,000 (0.5% of Titan's surface)	0.85 (max)		largest known body of surface liquid beside Earth's Ocean; the northern Moray Sinus bay is the only part measured bathymetrically
Titan	moon of Saturn	18.6	Ligeia Mare	predominantly methane, with small amounts of ethane and nitrogen		126,000	~0.2		
Titan	moon of Saturn	18.6	Punga Mare	hydrocarbons	surface, north polar region	61,000	~0.11		
Titan	moon of Saturn	18.6	(internal global ocean)	water? water–ammonia mixture?	subsurface, global	c. 80,000,000	< 300		global ocean of water under < 100 km of ice
Titania	moon of Uranus	?	(internal global ocean?)	water? water–ammonia mixture?	subsurface, global	c. 5,000,000	c. 15–50		possible global ocean under the ice (c. 150–200 km)
Oberon	moon of Uranus	?	(internal global ocean?)	water? water–ammonia mixture?	subsurface, global	c. 3,000,000	c. 15–40		possible global ocean under the ice (c. 250 km)
Triton	moon of Neptune	0.03	(internal global ocean, )	water? water–ammonia mixture?	subsurface, global	c. 20,000,000	c. 150–200		likely global ocean under the ice (c. 150–200 km)
Pluto	dwarf planet (plutino)	1	(internal global ocean)	water? water–ammonia mixture?	subsurface, global	c. 10,000,000–15,000,000	c. 100–180		possible global ocean under the ice (c. 150–230 km)
Makemake	dwarf planet (cubewano)	?	(internal global ocean?)	water? water–ammonia mixture?	subsurface, global	c. 3,000,000	?		possible global ocean under the ice
Gonggong	dwarf planet (SDO)	?	(internal global ocean?)	water? water–ammonia mixture?	subsurface, global	c. 2,000,000–3,000,000	?		possible global ocean under the ice
Eris	dwarf planet (SDO)	?	(internal global ocean?)	water? water–ammonia mixture?	subsurface, global	c. 10,000,000	c. 150–200		possible global ocean under the ice (c. 150–250 km)
Sedna	dwarf planet (sednoid)	?	(internal global ocean?)	water? water–ammonia mixture?	subsurface, global	c. 1,000,000	c. 15		possible global ocean under the ice (c. 200 km)

== See also ==
- List of Solar System extremes
  - List of tallest mountains in the Solar System
  - List of largest rifts, canyons and valleys in the Solar System
  - List of largest craters in the Solar System
- Hydrosphere
- List of lakes by area
- Tidal heating
- Tidal heating of Io
