= Gegania =

Gegania may refer to:

- Gegania (gens), a patrician family of Ancient Rome
- Gegania (ancient Roman woman), wife of Servius Tullius
- Gegania (priestess), a Vestal Virgin
- Gegania (gastropod), a synonym of Tuba, a genus of sea gastropods of the family Mathildidae
- Gegania (crater), a crater on 4 Vesta, see List of geological features on Vesta
