= List of largest rifts, canyons and valleys in the Solar System =

Following are the longest, widest, and deepest rifts and valleys in various worlds of the Solar System.

== List ==
World	Rift/Valley	Length	Max. width	Max. depth	Notes
Venus	Baltis Vallis	6,800 km (4,200 mi)	3 km (2 mi)		A lava channel
Earth	Atlantic Ocean	≈10,000 km (6,000 mi)	≈6,000 km (4,000 mi)	7.758 km (4.821 mi)	Length taken to be that of the Mid-Atlantic Ridge. (The ridge also has a secondary rift valley running its length.) The width is an average taken along the spreading ridges (Georgia–Senegal, Brazil – Bight of Benin, etc.). The greatest depth is the Romanche Trench. (The Puerto Rico Trench is not part of the rift system.)
Earth	Great Rift Valley	6,000 km (3,700 mi)	220 km (140 mi)	2 km (1 mi)	Width and depth are those of the Red Sea Rift, discounting continental shelves < 200 m deep. (These may not be the extremes of the whole rift system.) Length of the Red Sea section 2,250 km (1,400 mi).
Earth	Canadian Arctic Rift System	4,800 km (3,000 mi)			A northwesterly continuation of the Mid-Atlantic Ridge.
Earth	West Antarctic Rift System				
Earth	Midcontinent Rift System	2,000 km (1,200 mi)	70 km (40 mi)	0.27 km (0.17 mi)	Width & depth Isle Royale – Keweenaw Peninsula; may not be widest point.
Earth	Grand Canyon	277 km (200 mi)	4–18 km (0–10 mi)	1.857 km (1 mi)	
Earth	Colca Canyon			4.160 km (2.58 mi)	
Earth	Cotahuasi Canyon			3.535 km (2.197 mi)	
Moon	Vallis Snellius	592 km (368 mi)	≈ 30 km (20 mi)?		Width assumed to be approx. that of Vallis Rheita
Mars	Valles Marineris	3,769 km (2,342 mi)	200 km (100 mi)	7 km (4 mi)	
Mars	Kasei Valles	1,780 km (1,110 mi)	200 km (100 mi)	2–3 km	
Mars	Tiu Valles	1,720 km (1,070 mi)			
Mars	Ares Vallis	1,700 km (1,100 mi)			
Vesta	equatorial channels	Possibly up to 1,700 km (1,100 mi)			Length may be as much as the 1790-km circumference of Vesta
Vesta	Divalia Fossae	approx. 465 km (290 mi)	≈ 22 km		Compression fracture from Rheasilvia
Vesta	Saturnalia Fossae	at least 365 km (230 mi)	≈ 39 km		365 km visible at one point; rest in northern shadow. Compression fracture from Veneneia.
Europa	?	?	More than 20 km (10 mi)		Moon of Jupiter
Tethys	Ithaca Chasma	2,000 km (1,000 mi)	100 km (60 mi)	3–5 km (2–3 mi)	Moon of Saturn. Ithaca span approx. 75% the circumference of the Moon.
Charon	Argo Chasma	700 km (430 mi)	?	9 km (6 mi)	Moon of Pluto. Part of a belt of grabens that span most of the circumference of the moon. Only a section was seen on limb of Charon and so exact length uncertain. Not yet officially named.
Charon	Caleuche Chasma	400 km (250 mi)	?	13 km (8.1 mi)	Depth estimated in the range 10–16 km (6.2–9.9 mi).
Miranda	tectonic grabens		20 km	10-20 km	Extensive series of grabens and scarps that cover most of the moon.
Titania	Messina Chasma	1492 km (900 mi)	50 km (30 mi)	2-5 km	Geologically young belt of grabens that cut through craters. Bright, icy material exposed on canyon walls.
Pluto	Sleipnir Fossa	580 km (360 mi)	5-10 km	≈3 km (2 mi)	One of the six extensional "spider" fractures, cuts through Tartarus Dorsa . Not yet officially named.
Pluto	Lowell Regio canyons	≈200 km (120 mi)	75 km (45 mi)	≈3-4 km	A series of canyons found very close to the north pole. Not yet officially named.

== See also ==
- List of Solar System extremes
  - List of largest craters in the Solar System
  - List of tallest mountains in the Solar System
  - List of largest lakes and seas in the Solar System
