= Calpurnia =

Calpurnia may refer to:

== Ancient Rome ==
- Calpurnia gens, an ancient Roman family
  - Calpurnia (wife of Caesar), last wife of Roman dictator Julius Caesar
  - Calpurnia (wife of Pliny the Younger), third and last wife of Pliny the Younger and granddaughter of Calpurnius Fabatus
- Lex Acilia Calpurnia (67 BC), a severe law against political corruption
- Lex Calpurnia (149 BC), a law that established a permanent extortion court

== Science ==
- Calpurnia (plant), a genus in the family Fabaceae
- Calpurnia, the central crater in a series of "snowman craters" on the asteroid 4 Vesta
- 2542 Calpurnia, an asteroid

== Arts, entertainment, and media ==
- Calpurnia (band), a Canadian band
- Calpurnia (play), a 2018 play by Audrey Dwyer
- Calpurnia, African-American cook and maid for the Finch family in the novel To Kill a Mockingbird
- Shira Calpurnia, protagonist of three Warhammer 40,000 novels, see List of Warhammer 40,000 novels#Enforcer: Shira Calpurnia
- Calpurnia Virginia Tate, protagonist of the novel The Evolution of Calpurnia Tate

== People with the given name ==
- Calpernia Addams, American transgender author and activist
