= Lepidus (disambiguation) =

Lepidus was a member of the Second Triumvirate in ancient Rome.

Lepidus may also refer to:

- Marcus Aemilius Lepidus (disambiguation), several other Roman politicians
- Lepidus (dinosaur), a theropod dinosaur genus

== See also ==
- Lepida (disambiguation)
- Lapidus (name)
