= Vestalia Terra =

Highland plateau on Vesta

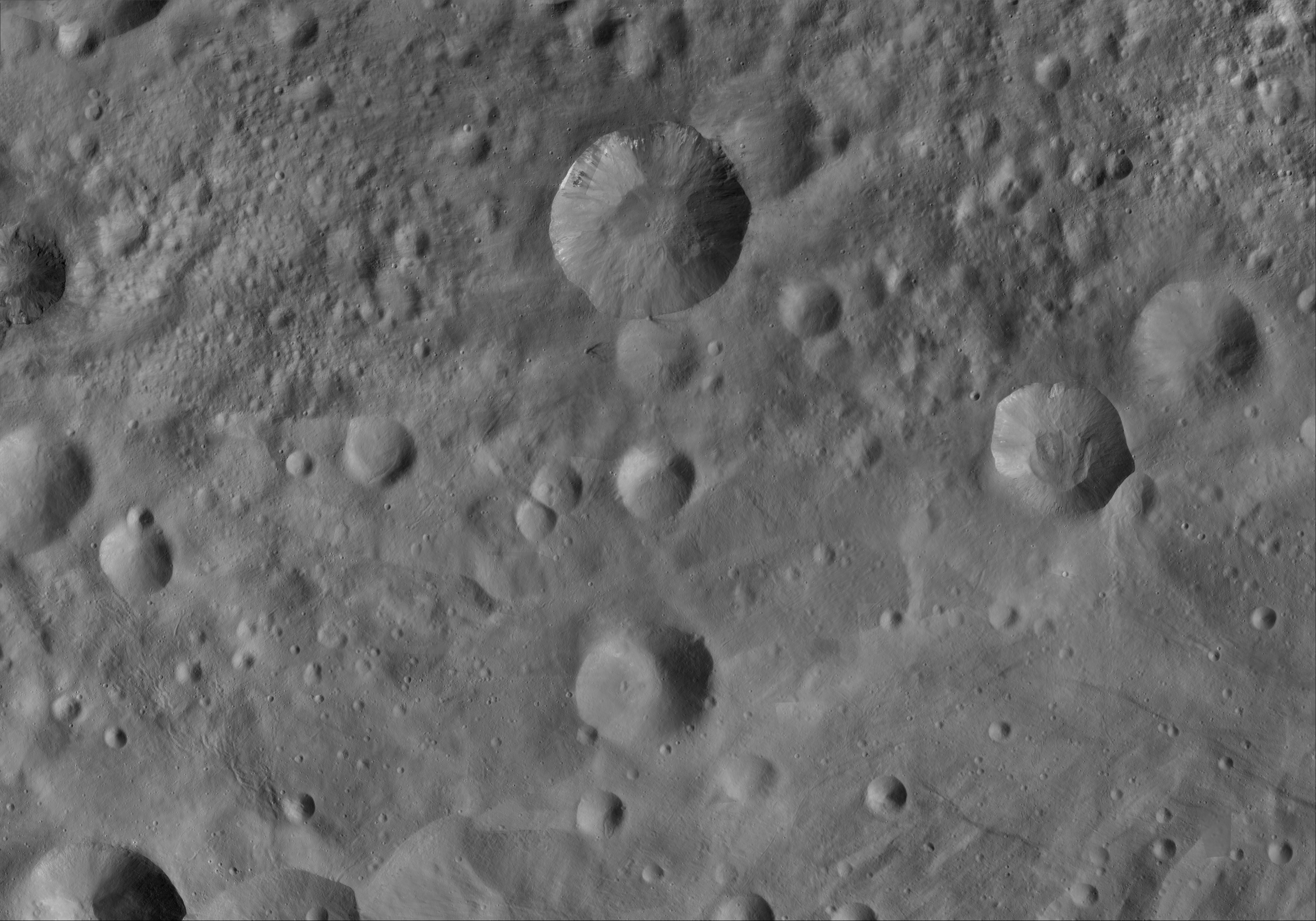
- A composite image of the Numisia Quadrangle on Vesta from Dawn, centered on the cratered highlands of Vestalia Terra
- Feature type: Plateau
- Location: 4 Vesta
- Coordinates: 3.73°S 33.47°E
- Surface area: ~80000 km^{2} (31000 mi^{2})
- Dimensions: ~300–430 km (190–270 mi) (North-south} ~160–200 km (99–124 mi) (East-west)
- Peak: ~20 km (12 mi) (mean)
- Discoverer: Dawn
- Eponym: Vestalia

Vestalia Terra (/vɛˈsteɪliə ˈtɛrə/) is a large highland plateau on the giant asteroid Vesta. Situated in Vesta's eastern hemisphere, Vestalia Terra is located near the equator and hosts the tallest point on Vesta. One of the largest named features on Vesta, it contains some of the most ancient terrain known on the asteroid. Additionally, Vestalia Terra is one of the few remaining magmatic features discovered on Vesta.

== Observation and naming ==
Vestalia Terra was identified as a major Vestian surface feature soon after the Dawn orbiter's arrival on 16 July 2011. The name Vestalia Terra was officially approved by the International Astronomical Union (IAU) on 27 December 2011; the name derives from the ancient Roman festival of Vestalia, a June festival dedicated to the goddess Vesta.

== Geography ==
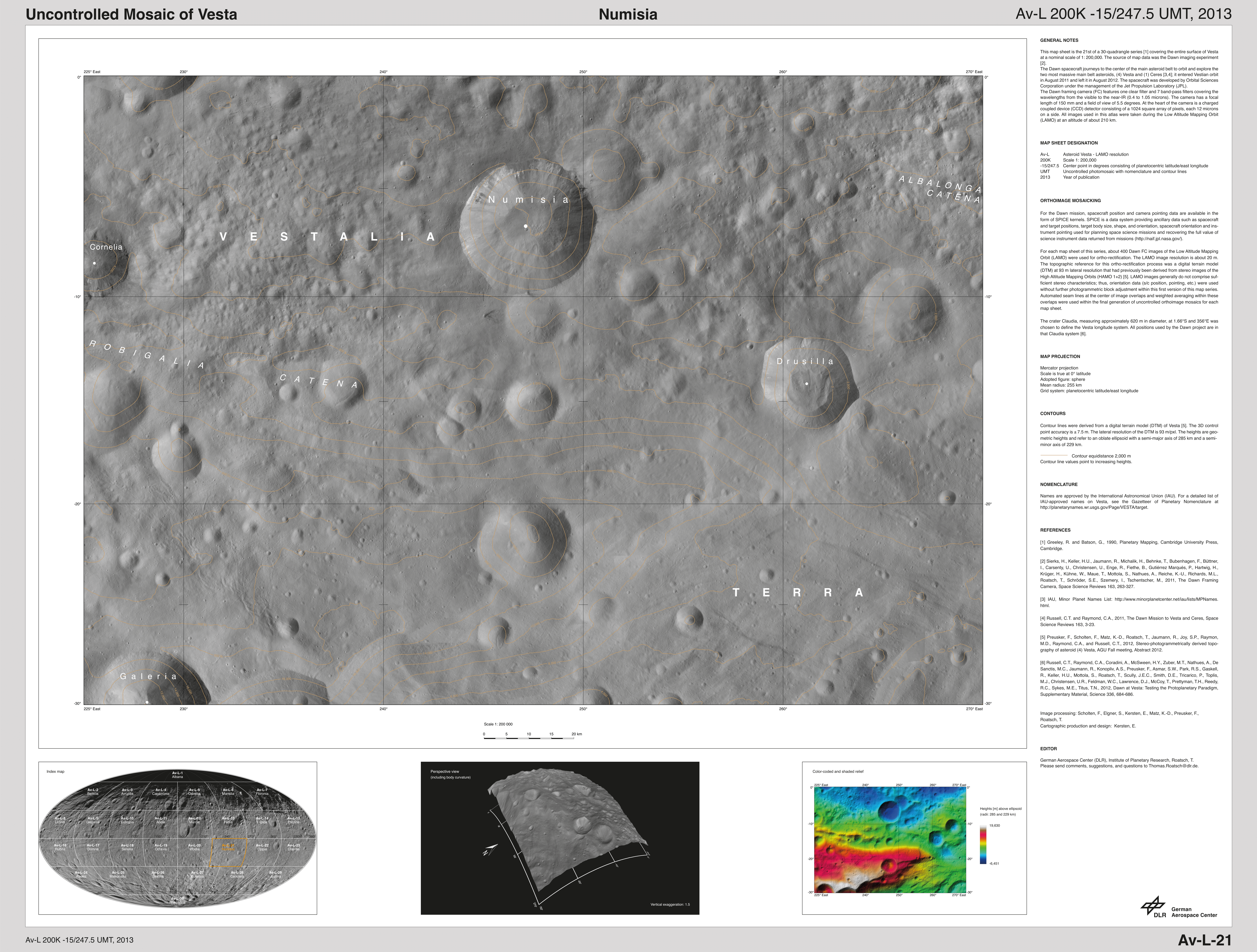
A map of the Numisia Quadrangle with features labelled

Located in Vesta's eastern hemisphere, Vestalia Terra is centered near the equator and extends between roughly 32°S to 24°N and 0°E to 76°E. The plateau is largely bounded by steep cliffs that represent the rims of several major impact basins: Postumia to the north, Feralia to the east, Rheasilvia to the southeast, and Veneneia to the southwest. Additionally, Saturnalia Fossae lies adjacent to Vestalia Terra to the northeast; however, Divalia Fossae, which cuts across the majority of Vesta's equator, does not intrude into Vestalia Terra.

=== Named features ===
Within Vestalia Terra is the small mountain Brumalia Tholus and several named craters. Additionally, two named crater chains cross Vestalia Terra: Albalonga Catena in the east, and Robigalia Catena in the west. Below is a list of all named features located within Vestalia Terra.

Feature	Type	Diameter (Note: The given values for Albalonga Catena and Robigalia Catena are their respective lengths)	Eponym	Coordinates
Brumalia Tholus	Mountain	48.21 km	Brumalia	6.31°S, 64.99°N
Albalonga Catena	Crater chain	161.74 km	Alba Longa	7.17°S, 72.61°E
Robigalia Catena	Crater chain	79.21 km	Robigalia	14.04°S, 19.78°E
Cornelia	Crater	14.9 km	Cornelia	9.37°S, 15.57°E
Drusilla	Crater	20.34 km	Julia Drusilla	15.05°S, 51.22°N
Fabia	Crater	11.62 km	Fabia	15.53°N, 55.76°E
Numisia	Crater	29.94 km	Numisia	7.48°S, 37.25°E
Teia	Crater	6.69 km	Teia	3.44°S, 61.06°E
Vibidia	Crater	7.10 km	Vibidia	26.96°S, 10.30°E

== Geology and characteristics ==
Vestalia Terra is a large, roughly pentagonal plateau ~365 by ~180 km, with an estimated surface area of approximately 80,000 square kilometers. Though very topographically prominent, with an average elevation of 20 kilometers above the surrounding terrain, there are localized variations in height. A broad valley partially separates the northern regions from the rest of Vestalia Terra, and a large unnamed mountain range in southern Vestalia Terra is Vesta's highest feature. Though Divalia Fossae does not extend into Vestalia Terra, a series of three pit chains—including Albalonga Catena and Robigalia Catena—within Vestalia Terra that are roughly aligned in the direction of Divalia Fossae's troughs. The orientation of these pit chains likely indicate that underground faulting took place at Vestalia Terra, though limited in extent by stronger rock. Vestalia Terra predates Divalia Fossae and all of its bordering basins, suggesting that it is an ancient feature and probably one of the oldest identified on Vesta.

The surface of Vestalia Terra is blanketed by ejecta from the bordering Veneneia and Rheasilvia basins. Compositionally, most of Vestalia Terra's surface is rather uniform, dominated by howardite—a mixture of diogenite and eucrite with large amounts of orthopyroxene and olivine—with a few outliers. In particular, ejecta blasted out by the impact event that created Teia transition from diogenite-enriched material close to the impact site, and eucrite-enriched near the edge of the ejecta blanket. A linear band of dark material, informally nicknamed the dark ribbon by researchers, stretches across Vestalia Terra from the southeast to the northwest. Analysis from Dawn's VIR instrument shows that the dark material is compositionally similar to most of Vestalia Terra, albeit with finer particles, suggesting that the materia is in fact a massive ejecta streak from Drusilla. How the ejecta managed to travel so far from Drusilla remains unclear, though in 2014 a team of planetary scientists led by D. L. Buczkowski proposed that the vaporization and outgassing of volatiles such as hydroxide could have helped the ejecta to "glide" along the surface.

Vesta's lower crust and upper mantle is composed of greater amounts of diogenite compared to its upper crust and surface, as indicated by the surface composition of the Rheasilvia basin which is deep enough to expose material from the lower crust and probably the upper mantle. That some craters within Vestalia Terra, such as Teia, have blasted out diogenite from their respective impact sites indicates that the interior of Vestalia Terra is composed of denser diogenite-rich material. This is supported by the detection of a large positive gravity anomaly at Vestalia Terra, where gravity is slightly stronger and therefore indicates a large mass concentration from denser mantle material. The material could represent an ancient igneous intrusion into sills, or potentially even an ancient mantle plume. Regardless, magmatic activity in Vestalia Terra confirms that Vesta formed and evolved like the terrestrial planets.

=== Brumalia Tholus ===
A cross-sectional diagram of a laccolith, likely representative of Brumalia Tholus's interior structure

Located in eastern Vestalia Terra is Brumalia Tholus, a small elongated dome-shaped hill with steep slopes. Brumalia Tholus sits to the west of and is aligned with Albalonga Catena, though a series of pits to the west of Brumalia Tholus suggest that Albalonga Catena continues westwards of the mountain. Brumalia Tholus likely represents a magmatic laccolith, where intruding magma from a dike does not erupt but still has enough pressure to dome the surface upwards. The location of the mountain on Albalonga Catena may indicate that the fault that created Albalonga Catena served as a conduit for magma to ascend.
