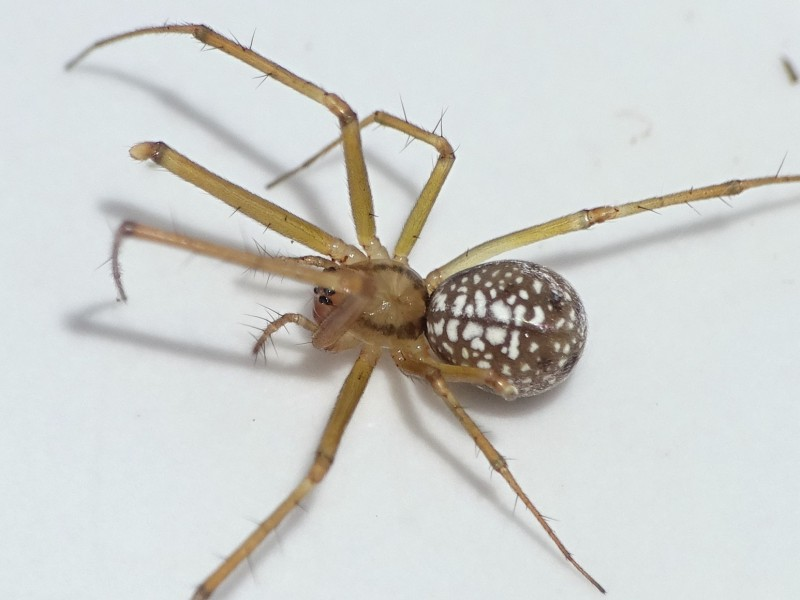

Scientific classification
- Domain: Eukaryota
- Kingdom: Animalia
- Phylum: Arthropoda
- Subphylum: Chelicerata
- Class: Arachnida
- Order: Araneae
- Infraorder: Araneomorphae
- Family: Linyphiidae
- Genus: Floronia
- Species: F. bucculenta

Binomial name
- Floronia bucculenta (Clerck, 1757)

Synonyms
- Several, including: Araneus bucculentus Clerck, 1757; Linyphia elegans Walckenaer, 1841

= Floronia bucculenta =

Species of spider

Floronia bucculenta is a species of spiders in the family Linyphiidae. It is found in Europe and Russia.
