= Mead (crater) =

Largest impact crater on Venus

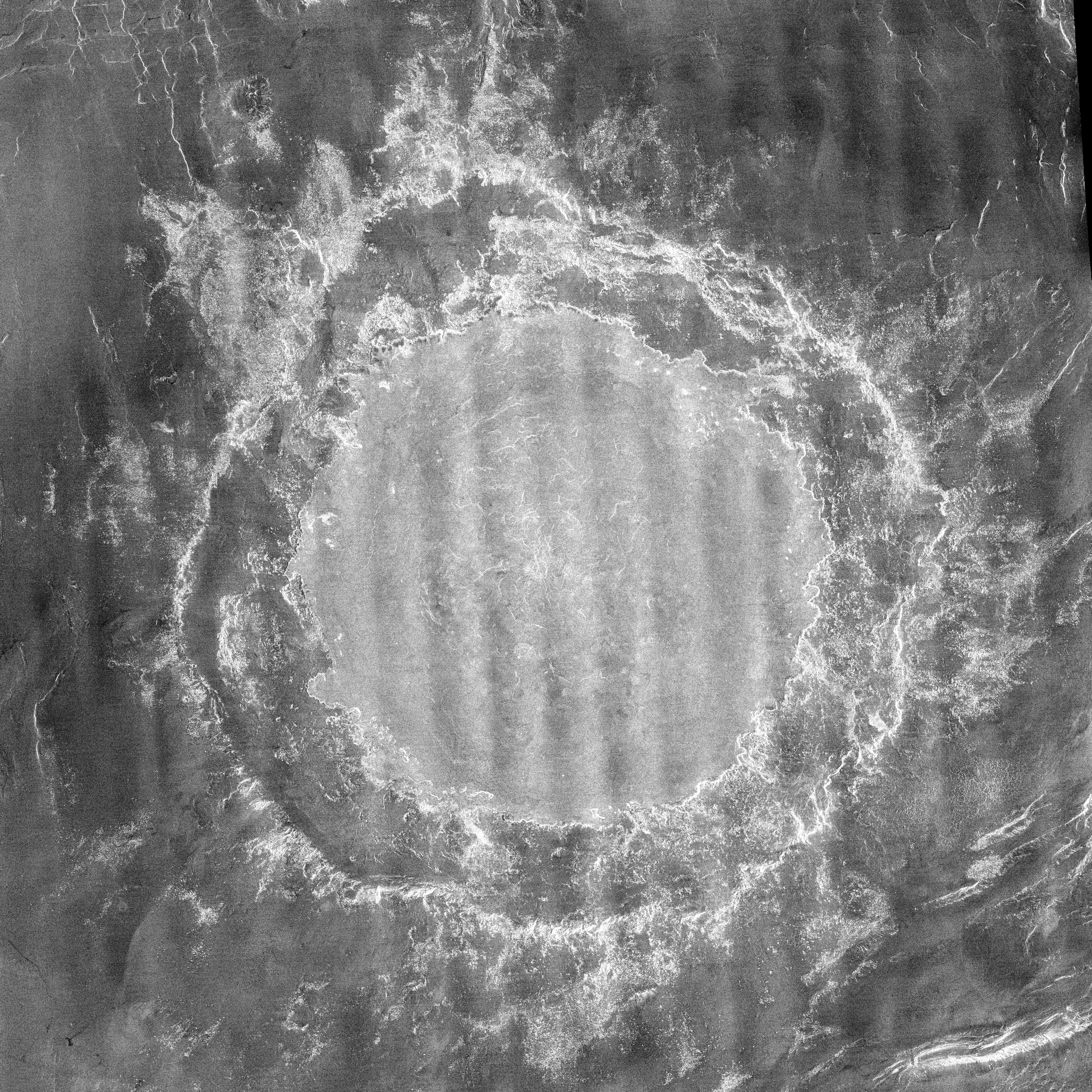
- A radar image of Mead
- Location: Venus
- Coordinates: 12.5°N 57.2°E
- Diameter: 270 km
- Eponym: Margaret Mead

Mead is an impact crater on Venus named in honor of the cultural anthropologist Margaret Mead. It is in the Mead quadrangle, which is named after the crater. It is one of the largest impact craters in the solar system.

== Geological structure ==
Mead Crater is the largest impact crater on Venus, with a diameter of 280 km (174 miles). It was first revealed from the Magellan mission by Herrick and Sharpton in 1996. The crater has an inner and an outer ring and a small ejecta blanket surrounding the outer ring. Mead Crater is relatively shallow (likely due to viscous relaxation and infilling) and the crater floor resembles surrounding plain in morphology. It has a shallow basin with a depth of about 1,100 metres (1.1 km).

Mead is classified as a multi-ring crater, and its innermost concentric scarp is interpreted as the rim of the original crater cavity. No inner peak-ring of mountain massifs is observed on Mead. The presence of hummocky, radar-bright crater ejecta crossing the radar-dark floor terrace and adjacent outer rim scarp suggests that the floor terrace is probably a giant rotated block that is concentric with but located outside the original crater cavity. The flat, somewhat brighter inner floor of Mead is interpreted to result from considerable infilling of the original crater cavity by impact melt and/or volcanic lavas. To the southeast of the crater rim, the deposition of hummocky ejecta appears to have been impeded by the topography of preexisting ridges, suggesting that this material was deposited in a very low ground-hugging manner.

== Discovery ==
During the Magellan mission, it collected data from Venus, which revealed Mead to be the largest exposed impact crater on Venus.
