= Tarpeia (crater) =

Crater on Vesta

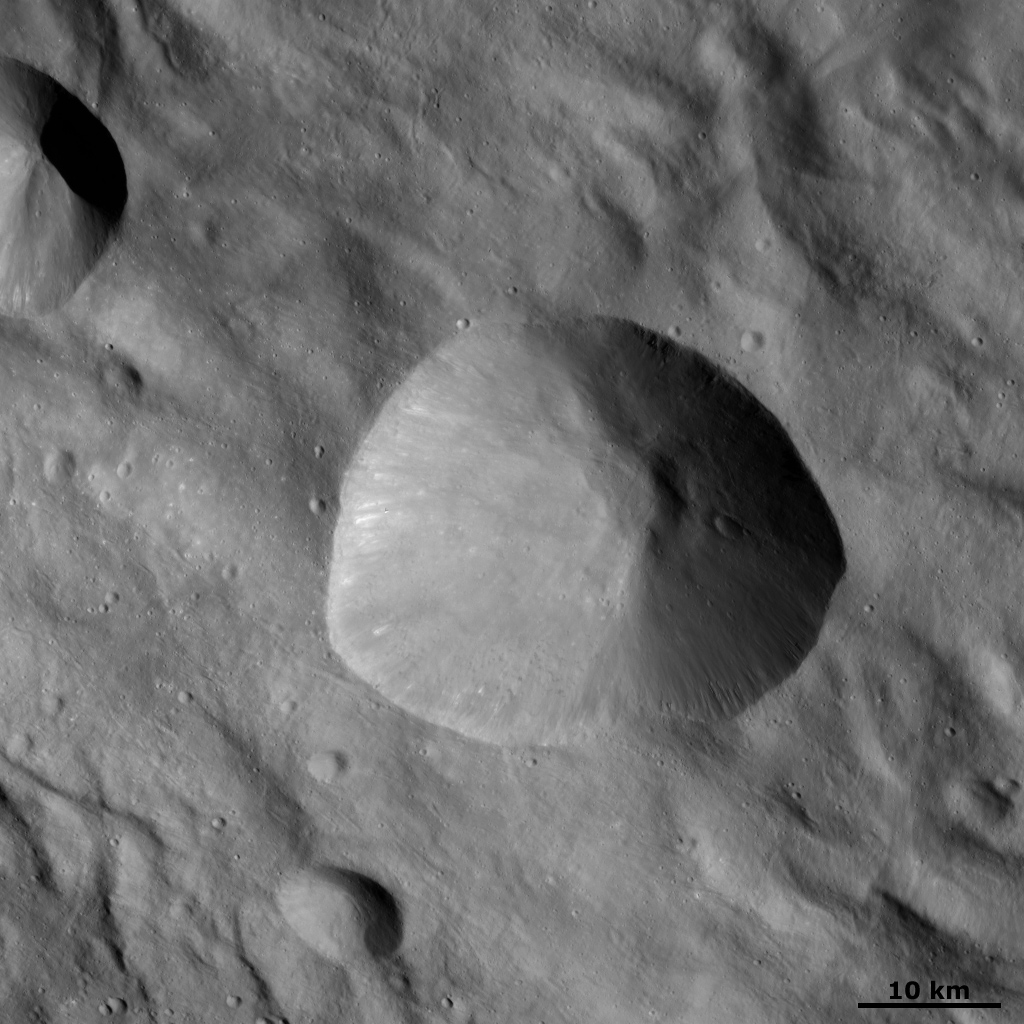
- A picture of Tarpeia crater on Vesta taken by Dawn at an altitude of 700 km
- Feature type: Impact crater
- Location: Rheasilvia basin, Vesta
- Coordinates: 69°28′S 179°18′E
- Diameter: 40.29 km
- Discoverer: Dawn
- Eponym: Tarpeia

Tarpeia is an impact crater on the asteroid 4 Vesta. It is named after the Roman Vestal Virgin Tarpeia, who, according to legend, betrayed the city of Rome to the Sabines. The name Tarpeia was officially approved by the International Astronomical Union (IAU) on 27 December 2011.

Tarpeia is a pristine irregularly-shaped crater located within a region of grooved terrain in Vesta's southern hemisphere, inside Rheasilvia basin. The interior of Tarpeia hosts numerous small craters less than 1 kilometer in size. The region immediately surrounding Tarpeia is relatively young and uniform; despite this, the interior of Tarpeia is compositionally diverse. The southwestern rim of Tarpeia is especially bright and anhydrous, likely due to the impact event that created it depleting the crust of hydroxide. The interior of Tarpeia contains iron-rich pyroxene and is rich in diogenite, likely brought up from Vesta's upper mantle by the impact event that created Rheasilvia basin.
