= List of Solar System extremes =

This article describes extreme locations of the Solar System. Entries listed in bold are Solar System-wide extremes.

== By feature ==
Record	Data	Feature	Ref.
Largest canyon	4000 km long, 200 km wide	Valles Marineris, Mars	
Tallest mountain	21.9–26 km (13.6–16.2 mi) 25 km (16 mi)	Olympus Mons, Mars Unnamed mountain, Máni	
Tallest volcano	25 km (15.5 mi)	Olympus Mons, Mars	
Tallest cliff	20 km (12.4 mi)	Verona Rupes, Miranda, Uranus	
Largest impact crater	2,700 km (1,700 mi)	North Polar Basin, Mars	

== By class ==
Type	Average density		Average temperature		Average surface gravity	
Type	Lowest	Highest	Lowest	Highest	Lowest	Highest
Star	1.4 g/cm^{3} Sun		5778 K Sun		274 m/s^{2} Sun	
Major planet	0.7 g/cm^{3} Saturn	5.51 g/cm^{3} Earth	73 K Neptune	733 K Venus	3.70 m/s^{2} Mercury	23.1 m/s^{2} Jupiter
Dwarf planet	1.4 ±0.2 g/cm^{3} Orcus (Note: Though astronomers generally accept Orcus as a dwarf planet, some doubt remains)	2.52 ±0.05 g/cm^{3} Eris	30 K Makemake	167 K Ceres	≈0.2 m/s^{2} Orcus	0.8 m/s^{2} Eris
Major moon of major or dwarf planet (Note: A major moon is a moon that is hydrostatically round.)	0.98 g/cm^{3} Tethys	3.53 g/cm^{3} Io	38 K Triton	250 K Moon	0.064 m/s^{2} Mimas	1.796 m/s^{2} Io

Type	Escape velocity		Mass		Volume (radius)	
Type	Lowest	Highest	Lowest	Highest	Lowest	Highest
Star	617.7 km/s Sun		332,830 M_{Earth} Sun		695,000 km Sun	
Major planet	4.3 km/s Mercury	59.5 km/s Jupiter	0.055 M_{Earth} Mercury	318 M_{Earth} Jupiter	2500 km Mercury	69886 km Jupiter
Dwarf planet	≈0.43 km/s Orcus	1.3 km/s Eris	0.0000916 M_{Earth} Orcus (Note: Mass calculated using Vanth's estimated mass)	0.0028 M_{Earth} Eris	487.3 km Ceres	1188 km Pluto
Major moon of major or dwarf planet	0.16 km/s Mimas	2.74 km/s Ganymede	0.000006 M_{Earth} Mimas	0.0250 M_{Earth} Ganymede	198 km Mimas	2634 km Ganymede

Extreme characteristic	Major planet	Dwarf planet	Major moon (of a major or dwarf planet)
Densest atmosphere	Venus (Note: As the transition from atmosphere to other is unclear for the giant planets, they are not included in this)	Pluto	Titan

== By object ==
Astronomical body	Elevation (height above/below datum)		Elevation (height above/below base)		Surface temperature	
Astronomical body	Highest	Lowest	Highest	Lowest	Highest	Lowest
Sun	N/A				5,000,000 K In a solar flare	1240 K In a sunspot
Mercury			3 kilometres (1.9 mi); Caloris Montes, northwest Caloris Basin rim mountains		723 K Dayside of Mercury	89 K Permanently shaded polar craters
Venus	11 kilometres (6.8 mi); Maxwell Montes, Ishtar Terra	3 kilometres (1.9 mi); Diana Chasma, Aphrodite Terra			755 K lowlands of Venus	644 K Maxwell Montes, Ishtar Terra
Earth	8,848 metres (29,029 ft); Mount Everest, Nepal - Tibet, China	10,971 metres (35,994 ft); Challenger Deep, Mariana Trench, Pacific Ocean	10,200 metres (33,500 ft); Mauna Kea, Hawaii, United States of America	7 kilometres (4.3 mi); Mariana Trench, Pacific Ocean	330 K Furnace Creek Ranch, Death Valley, United States (more info)	184 K Vostok Station, Antarctica (more info)
Mars	**27 kilometres (17 mi)**; **Olympus Mons, Tharsis**	6 kilometres (3.7 mi); Hellas Planitia	**24 kilometres (15 mi)**; **Olympus Mons, Tharsis**	9 kilometres (5.6 mi); Melas Chasma, Valles Marineris	293 K Martian equator in midsummer day	120 K Martian poles in the depths of winter night
Jupiter	N/A				152 K	110 K
Saturn	N/A				143 K	82 K
Uranus	N/A				68 K	59 K
Neptune	N/A				53 K	50 K
Moon	10,786 metres (35,387 ft); 5.4125°, 201.3665°	9.06 kilometres (5.63 mi); Antoniadi Crater (-172.58°E, 70.38°S)			400 K midday on the equator	26 K Permanently shadowed southwestern edge of the northern polar zone Hermite Crater in winter solstice
Io			17.3 kilometres (10.7 mi); Boosaule Montes			
Europa			2 kilometres (1.2 mi) conical mountain (34.5N, 169.5W)		132 K Subsolar temperature	
Ganymede					156 K Subsolar temperature	80 K Nighttime temperature
Callisto					168 K Subsolar temperature	80 K Predawn nighttime temperature
Titan	2 km (1.2 mi); Mithrim Montes, Xanadu					
Mimas						
Enceladus					110 K Tiger Stripes	
Tethys						
Dione						
Rhea						
Iapetus			20 kilometres (12 mi)Voyager Mountains, equatorial ridge and bulge			
Ariel						
Umbriel						
Titania						
Oberon						
Miranda			20 kilometres (12 mi) Verona Rupes			
Triton						
Nereid						
Proteus						
Charon						
Ceres			4.5 kilometres (2.8 mi); Ahuna Mons		235 K	
Pluto	3.4 km (2.1 mi); Norgay Montes, Tombaugh Regio				45 K	35 K
Eris					41 K	30 K
Makemake						
Haumea						
The bodies included in this table are: (1) planemos; (2) major planets, dwarf planets, or moons of major or dwarf planets, or stars; (3) hydrostatically round so as to be able to provide a geodetic datum line.

== By distance ==
- List of Solar System objects most distant from the Sun

== See also ==
- Solar System
- Lists of geological features of the Solar System
- List of gravitationally rounded objects of the Solar System
- Extremes on Earth
