= Marcus Aemilius Lepidus (disambiguation) =

Marcus Aemilius Lepidus (89 BC – 13/12 BC) was a member of the Second Triumvirate alongside Octavian and Mark Antony.

Marcus Aemilius Lepidus may also refer to:

- Marcus Aemilius Lepidus (consul 232 BC), died 216 BC.
- Marcus Aemilius Lepidus (consul 187 BC), c. 230 – 152 BC, princeps senatus and pontifex maximus who completed the via Aemilia and the basilica Aemilia.
- Marcus Aemilius Lepidus (consul 158 BC)
- Marcus Aemilius Lepidus (consul 78 BC), c. 121 – 77 BC, who led a rebellion the year after his consulship but failed and died in Sardinia.
- Marcus Aemilius Lepidus Minor, died 30 BC.
- Marcus Aemilius Lepidus (consul 6 AD), c. 30 BC – 33 AD.
- Marcus Aemilius Lepidus (executed by Caligula), 6 – 39 AD.
