= Snowman craters =

Impact craters on 4 Vesta

Marcia, Calpurnia, and Minucia
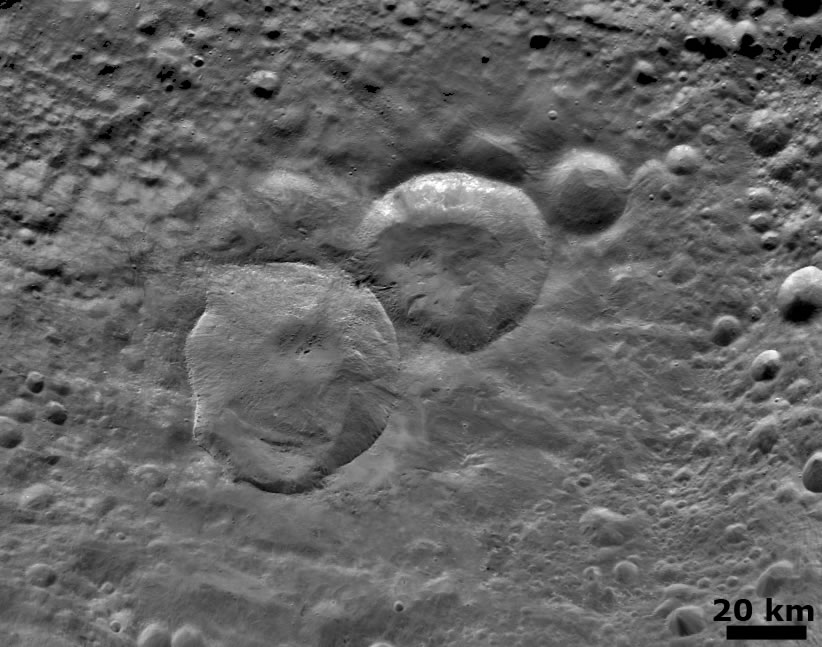
- The snowman craters. From left to right are Marcia, Calpurnia, and Minucia.
- Feature type: Impact craters
- Location: 4 Vesta
- Coordinates: 8.96°N 20.45°W (Marcia); 16.72°N 169.10°W (Calpurnia); 20.20°N 177.20°W (Minucia)
- Diameter: 67.60 km (Marcia); 50.19 km (Calpurnia); 23.15 km (Minucia)
- Discoverer: Dawn
- Eponym: Roman Vestal Virgins

The snowman craters are a set of three overlapping craters on the giant asteroid 4 Vesta: Marcia, Calpurnia, and Minucia. The crater set lies in Vesta's northern hemisphere, spanning southwest to northeast from the equator to nearly 30°N. The craters formed sequentially, with the smallest and northernmost – Minucia – being the oldest, and the largest and southernmost – Marcia – being the youngest.

== Naming ==
The crater set was given the nickname "snowman craters" by Dawn's imaging team due to its resemblance to snowman sculptures. The individual craters were all named after Vestal Virgins of ancient Roman religion; the names were all adopted by the International Astronomical Union in 2011. Marcia's name was adopted on 30 September, and Calpurnia and Minucia's names were adopted on 27 December.

== Characteristics ==
The crater complex stretches southwest to northeast from Vesta's equator to nearly 30°N. A low-albedo region, informally named "Olbers" in Hubble Space Telescope images before Dawn's arrival, lies to the east. Marcia is the largest and southernmost of the three, Minucia the smallest and northernmost, and Calpurnia in between. The terrain surrounding the complex is softened and darkened by craters' ejecta blankets. Stratigraphically, the craters lie one on top of the other, with Minucia the oldest and Marcia the youngest. Initially, it was believed that Marcia and Minucia formed simultaneously from the impact of a binary asteroid's components.

=== Marcia ===
Marcia has a diameter of 67.6 km, spanning 68 km north to south and 58 km east to west. Its elongated shape suggests that it was formed by an oblique, low-angle impact. It is the largest well-preserved post-Rheasilvia crater and shows a complex geology. Its crater rim is irregular in the west and more rounded in shape in the east, with outcroppings of bright material. Its northern wall has gully-like features leading to lobate deposits near the bottom of the crater. The eastern crater wall is relatively steep. Part of its floor terrain has pits ranging in size from a few tens of meters to hundreds of meters. The pits are usually rimless and some appear in clusters. The origin of the pits are debated, but may be the result of the sublimation of volatiles. The southern part of the floor is elevated on a terrace, separated from the northern floor by a scarp. The southern floor is smoother in texture with lobes of material. Marcia's ejecta blanket is darker on its eastern side.

=== Calpurnia ===
Calpurnia has a diameter of 50.2 km, spanning 54 km north to south and 52 km east to west. It is about half as deep as Marcia. Its crater rim is less defined than Marcia's, and part of Marcia's ejecta blanket covers its floor and southwest rim. Calpurnia's ejecta is also dark and partially constrained by the Vestalia Terra highlands to the east. Most of its own ejecta field was obliterated by the Marcia impact.

=== Minucia ===
Minucia has a diameter of 23.2 km, spanning 26 km north to south and 23 km east to west. Its rim is not well-defined, and it has a lower than normal depth-to-diameter ratio compared to similarly-sized craters. Its floor has an oval-shaped lobate deposit, which may be from landslide material or impact melt.
