= Albana =

Albana may refer to:

- Albana (grape), an Italian wine grape
- Albana, an alternative name for the German wine grape Elbling
- Albana, an alternative name for the Spanish wine grape Tempranillo blanco
- Albanopolis, an ancient city in Caucasian Albania, believed to have been located near modern Derbent
- A female Lezianos
