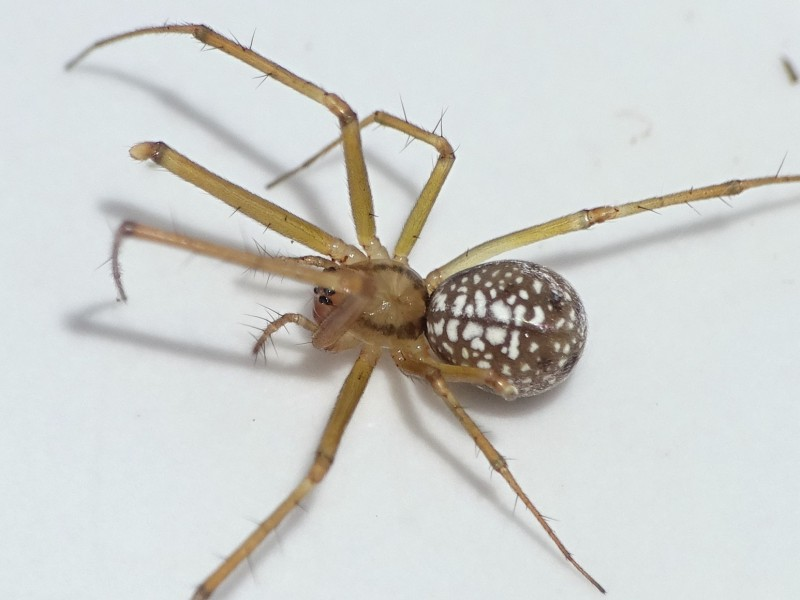
- Floronia bucculenta

Scientific classification
- Kingdom: Animalia
- Phylum: Arthropoda
- Subphylum: Chelicerata
- Class: Arachnida
- Order: Araneae
- Infraorder: Araneomorphae
- Family: Linyphiidae
- Genus: Floronia; Simon

Species
- 6, see text

= Floronia =

Genus of spiders

Floronia is a genus of spiders in the family Linyphiidae first described by Eugène Simon in 1887.

== Species ==
As of 2017, it contains 6 species:

- Floronia annulipes Berland, 1913
- Floronia bucculenta (Clerck, 1757)
- Floronia exornata (L. Koch, 1878)
- Floronia hunanensis Li & Song, 1993
- Floronia jiuhuensis Li & Zhu, 1987
- Floronia zhejiangensis Zhu, Chen & Sha, 1987
