= Clodia Laeta =

Roman vestal virgin

Clodia Laeta (died 213) was a Roman vestal virgin.

Clodia Laeta belonged to a prominent family. While the name of her father is unknown, he is noted to have been of senatorial rank. She was appointed a vestal by the Pontifex maximus, who was at that time the same person as the Emperor.

In 211, Emperor Caracalla succeeded to the throne. During his reign, four vestal virgins were prosecuted for having broken their vow of chastity (crimen incesti): Aurelia Severa, Pomponia Rufina, Cannutia Crescentina and Clodia Laeta. In contrast to the usual trials of this kind, no men were named and accused as accomplices of the crime. The accused vestals were all judged guilty as charged and sentenced to death. Cannutia Crescentina avoided the execution by committing suicide.

Clodia Laeta was the central figure of the trial. The trial was regarded with suspicion because no men were named or accused as the lovers of the vestals. According to Cassius Dio, it was the Emperor himself who had sexually assaulted Clodia Laeta; that the other three vestals were witnesses, and that they were all falsely accused to hide the crime of the Emperor. Cassius Dio supported his theory on the behaviour of Clodia Laeta on her way to her execution, during which she screamed that the Emperor himself was well aware of her innocence.
