= Vibidia (crater) =

Impact crater on 4 Vesta

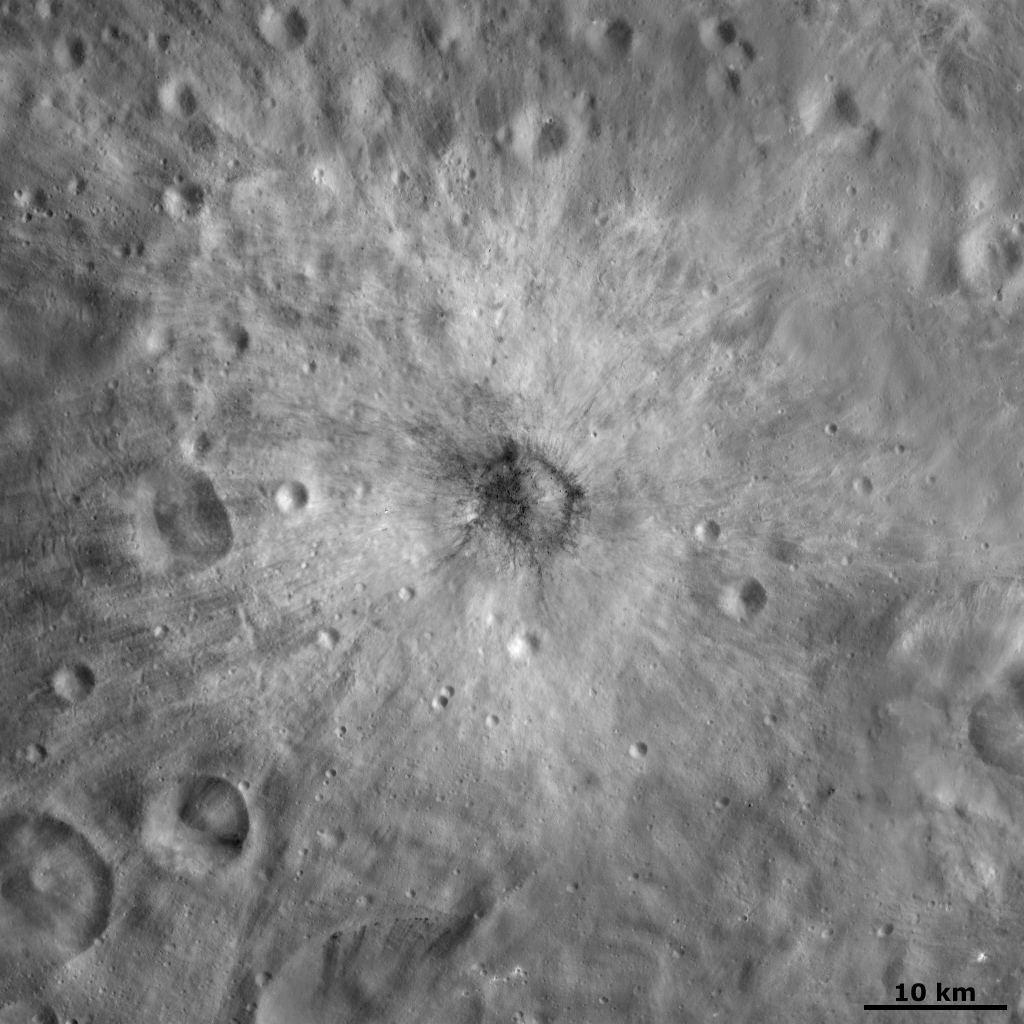
- A picture of Vibidia crater on Vesta taken by Dawn at an altitude of 700 km
- Feature type: Impact crater
- Location: Vestalia Terra, 4 Vesta
- Coordinates: 26.96°S 10.30°E
- Diameter: 7.1 km (4.4 mi)
- Discoverer: Dawn
- Eponym: Vibidia, Vestal virgin

Vibidia is an impact crater on the asteroid 4 Vesta, located at 26.9°S and 139.9°W. It has a diameter of 7.1 km. There is a distinctive ray-like pattern of bright and dark material, with the bright rays extending circularly for 15 km around Vibidia, and the dark rays mostly restricted to within the crater and on the rim. The rays cut across older craters, whereas a few younger craters have formed on top of them.

== Observation and naming ==
Vibidia was first identified as a distinct spectral unit from observations by the Hubble Space Telescope (HST), which performed albedo and spectral observations of Vesta in 1994, 1996, 2007, and 2010. It was then informally given the provisional designation of Feature #11. As with Vesta's other surface features, Vibidia was observed for the first time in detail upon the arrival of the Dawn orbiter on 16 July 2011. It was named after the Roman Vestal Virgin Vibidia on 27 December 2011.
