= Lepida =

Lepida, witty in Latin, may refer to:

- Aemilia Lepida, a Roman woman
- Aemilia Lepida (fiancee of Claudius) (5 BC-?), a noble Roman woman and matron
- Domitia Lepida the Elder (c. 19 BC-59), the oldest child of Lucius Domitius Ahenobarbus and Antonia Major
- Domitia Lepida the Younger (c. 10 BC-54), the younger daughter of Lucius Domitius Ahenobarbus and Antonia Major
- Junia Lepida (c. 18-65), a Roman noble woman
- a mountaintop of Mount Erymanthos in Greece
- Lepida Gorge of Parnon in Arcadia, Greece

== See also ==
- Lepidus (disambiguation)
