= Divalia Fossae =

Trough system on Vesta

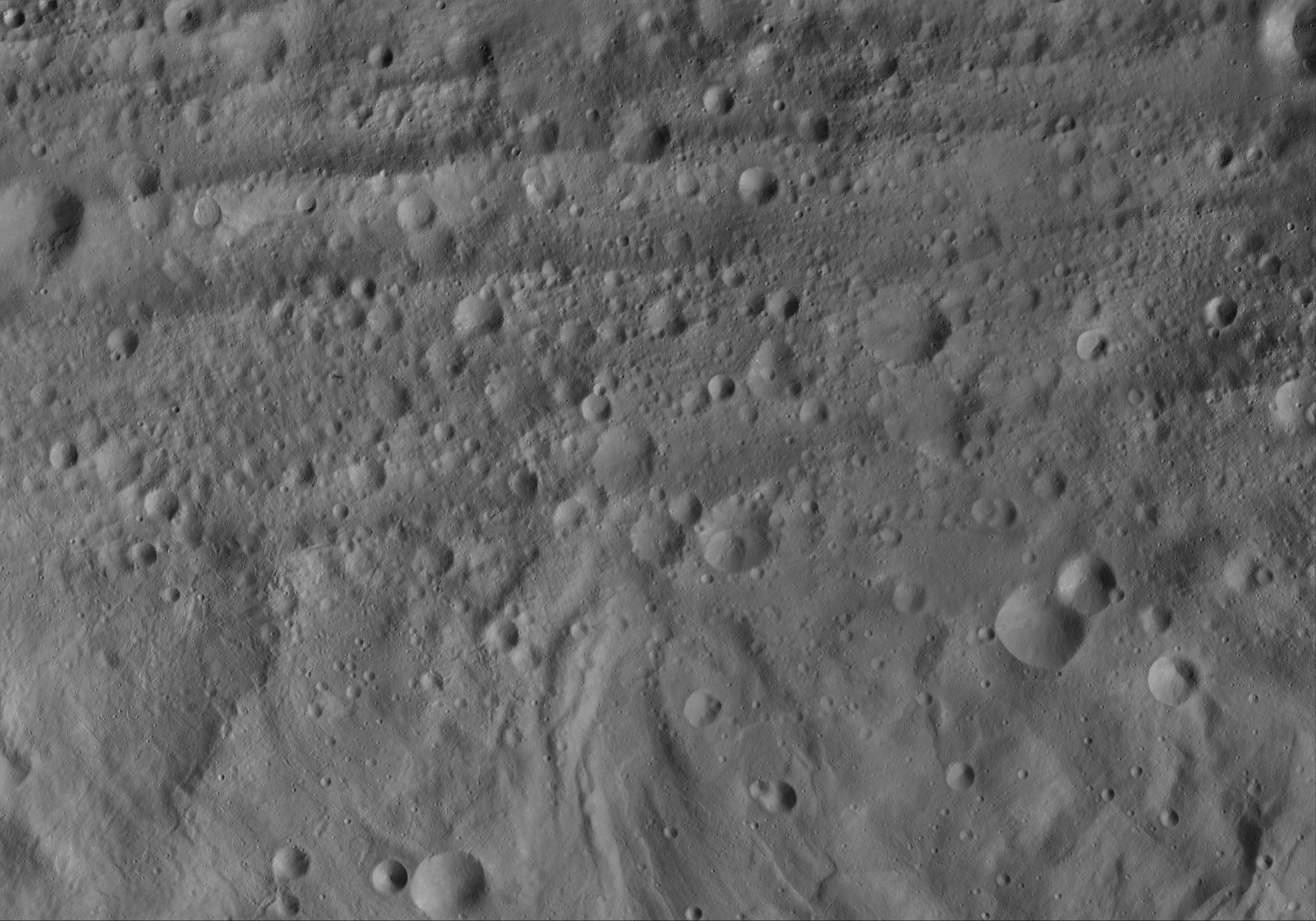
- A section of Divalia Fossae between 45°E and 90°E
- Feature type: Trough system
- Location: Equator of 4 Vesta
- Coordinates: 9°3′S 196°14′E
- Length: 549.37 km
- Discoverer: Dawn
- Eponym: Divalia

Divalia Fossae /dɪˈveɪliə ˈfɒseɪ/ is the large series of parallel equatorial troughs on the giant asteroid 4 Vesta. It is one of the longest chasms in the Solar System, stretching across roughly two-thirds of Vesta's equator. The trough system is named after the Roman festival of Divalia; the name Divalia Fossae was officially approved by the International Astronomical Union (IAU) on 27 December 2011.

== Geology ==
Divalia Fossae is one of Vesta's two major trough systems, with the other being Saturnalia Fossae. Divalia Fossae consists of many—up to seven in some regions—parallel troughs ranging from a few hundred meters to about 20.5 kilometers in diameter. The troughs run roughly parallel to Vesta's equator, encircling roughly two-thirds of the body. Divalia Fossae terminates at the cratered highlands of Vestalia Terra. Divalia Fossae in turn overlaps the troughs of Saturnalia Fossae, meaning that Divalia Fossae is the younger of the two trough systems; in 2021, a team of planetary scientists led by H. C. J. Cheng used crater counting to estimate Divalia Fossae's age as roughly 3.4–3.6 billion years old.

The troughs of Divalia Fossae appear to run concentrically around the Rheasilvia impact basin. As such, early hypotheses of the origin of Divalia Fossae have invoked the impact event that created Rheasilvia, with energy from the impact event shattering Vesta's crust and leading to normal faulting along its equator. Estimates of Divalia Fossae's age via crater counts agree with the age of the Rheasilvia basin, supporting a relationship between the two. However, the troughs of Divalia Fossae are not truly concentric with respect to Rheasilvia's center. Furthermore, the northernmost of Divalia Fossae's troughs cross-cut sections of Rheasilvia's rim. As the formation of Rheasilvia spanned roughly 2–3 hours, and models of fracturing in Vesta's interior take place within only minutes, this implies that Divalia Fossae formed after the Rheasilvia impact event. An alternative hypothesis invokes true polar wander after the Rheasilvia impact event, with the impact event additionally decreasing Vesta's rotational period. The reorientation and "spinning up" of Vesta is capable of inducing stresses across Vesta's equator whilst still remaining consistent with the observed characteristics of Divalia Fossae. A second hypothesis instead proposes that Divalia Fossae represents a large series of crater chains (catenae) from the debris ejected by the formation of Rheasilvia.

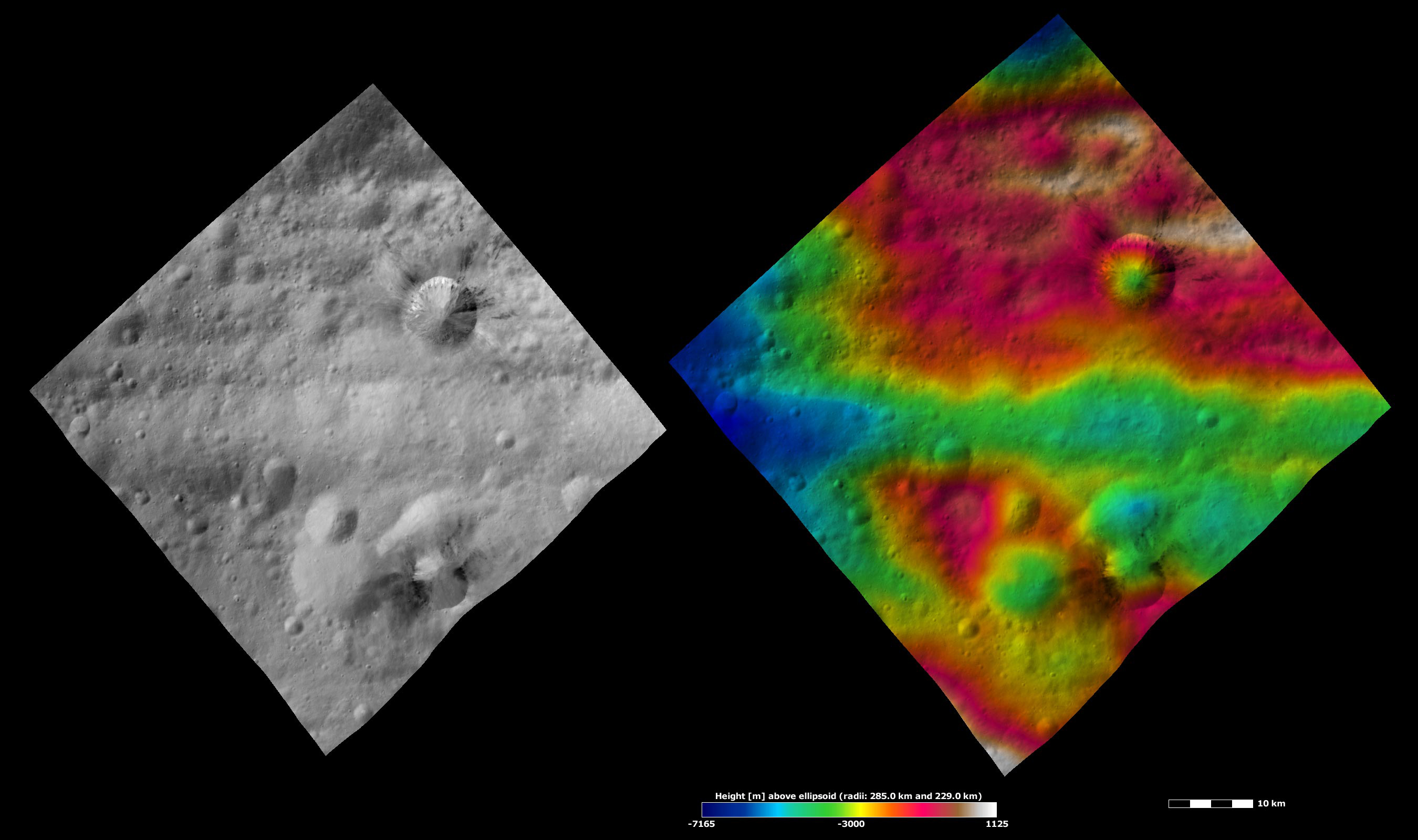
A section of Divalia Fossa (green horizontal band), with lesser parallel troughs to the north and south

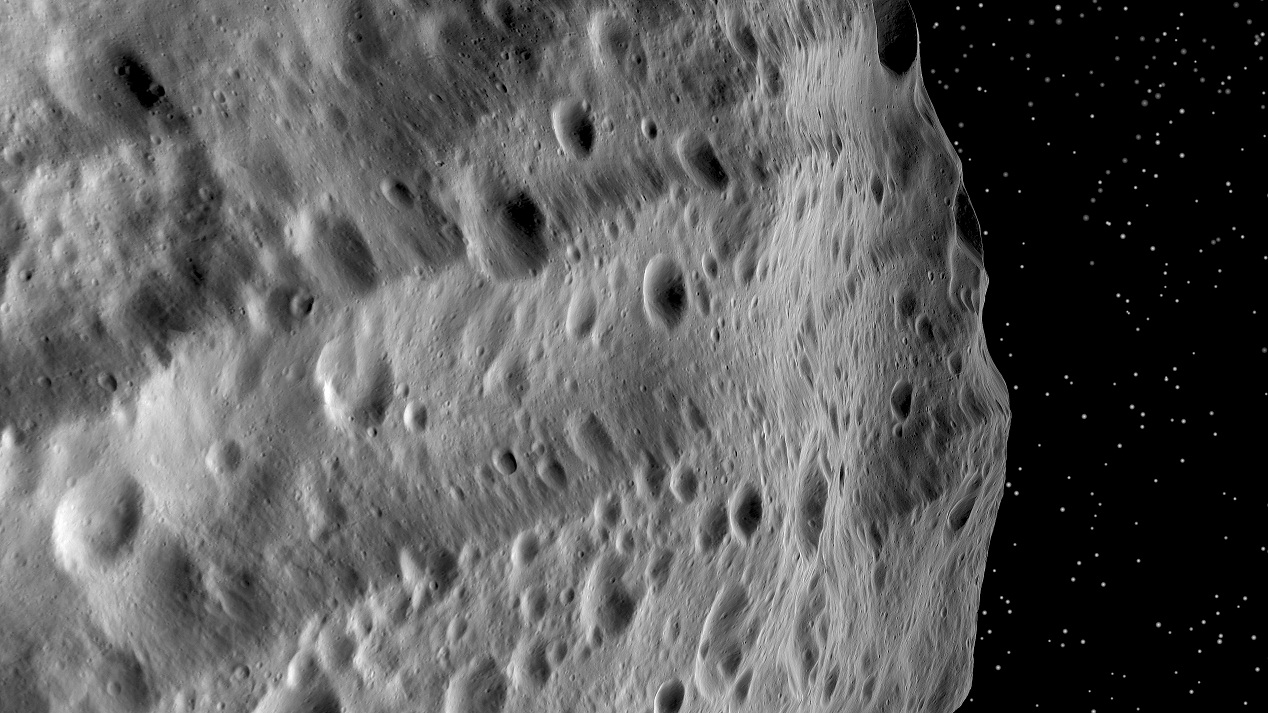
A computer-generated view of a portion of Divalia Fossa

== See also ==
- Saturnalia Fossae – A similar system of troughs on Vesta
