= List of largest craters in the Solar System =

Following are the largest impact craters on various worlds of the Solar System. For a full list of named craters, see List of craters in the Solar System. The ratio column compares the crater diameter with the diameter of the impacted celestial body. The maximum crater diameter is 157% of the body diameter (the circumference along a great circle).

Body	Crater	Crater diameter	Body diameter	Ratio	Images	Notes
Mercury	Caloris	1,550 km (963 mi)	4,880 km	32%		
Mercury	Rembrandt	715 km (444 mi)	4,880 km	15%		
Venus	Mead	280 km (170 mi)	12,100 km	2%		
Earth	Vredefort	250–300 km (160–190 mi)	12,740 km	2%		
Earth	Chicxulub crater	182 km (113 mi)	12,740 km	1.4%		Cause or contributor of the Cretaceous–Paleogene extinction event
Earth	Sudbury Basin	130 km (80 mi)	12,740 km	1%		
Moon (moon of Earth)	Procellarum	3,000 km (2,000 mi)	3,470 km	86%		Not confirmed as an impact basin.
Moon (moon of Earth)	South Pole–Aitken basin	2,500 km (1,600 mi)	3,470 km	70%		
Moon (moon of Earth)	Imbrium	1,145 km (711 mi)	3,470 km	33%		
Mars	North Polar Basin	10,600 × 8,500 km (6,550 × 5,250 mi)	6,780 km	125–155%		Not confirmed as an impact basin
Mars	Utopia	3,300 km (2,100 mi)	6,780 km	50%		Largest confirmed impact basin on Mars and in the Solar System
Mars	Hellas	2,300 km (1,400 mi)	6,780 km	34%		Largest visible crater in the Solar System
Mars	Isidis	~1,900 km (1,200 mi)	6,780 km	28%		Heavily degraded to the northeast
Mars	Argyre	1,700 km (1,100 mi)	6,780 km	25.1%		May have an outer ring 2750 km in diameter
Vesta (asteroid)	Rheasilvia	505 km (310 mi)	529 km (569 km)	90%		See also: List of tallest mountains in the Solar System
Vesta (asteroid)	Veneneia	395 km (250 mi)	529 km (569 km)	70%		Partially obscured by Rheasilvia
Ceres (dwarf planet)	Kerwan	284 km (180 mi)	952 km	30%		Faint shallow crater, below the center of this image.
Ceres (dwarf planet)	Yalode	271 km (170 mi)	952 km	28%		
Hygiea (asteroid)	Serpens	180±15	434 ± 14 km	40%		
Ganymede (moon of Jupiter)	Epigeus	343 km (213 mi)	5,270 km	6.5%		
Callisto (moon of Jupiter)	Valhalla	360 km (224 mi)	4,820 km	7.5%		
Callisto (moon of Jupiter)	Heimdall	210 km (130 mi)	4,820 km	4%		Bright white crater, bottom right.
Mimas (moon of Saturn)	Herschel	139 km (86 mi)	396 km	35%		See also: List of tallest mountains in the Solar System
Tethys (moon of Saturn)	Odysseus	445 km (277 mi)	1,060 km	42%		
Dione (moon of Saturn)	Evander	350 km (220 mi)	1,123 km	34%		
Rhea (moon of Saturn)	Mamaldi	480 km (300 mi)	1,530 km	31%		
Rhea (moon of Saturn)	Tirawa	360 km (220 mi)	1,530 km	24%		
Titan (moon of Saturn)	Menrva	392 km (244 mi)	5,150 km	7.5%		
Iapetus (moon of Saturn)	Abisme	767 km (480 mi)	1,470 km	52%		
Iapetus (moon of Saturn)	Turgis	580 km (360 mi)	1,470 km	40%		
Iapetus (moon of Saturn)	Engelier	504 km (313 mi)	1,470 km	34%		
Iapetus (moon of Saturn)	Gerin	445 km (277 mi)	1,470 km	30%		Gerin is overlain by Engelier
Iapetus (moon of Saturn)	Falsaron	424 km (263 mi)	1,470 km	29%		
Titania (moon of Uranus)	Gertrude	326 km (203 mi)	1,580 km	21%		Little of Titania has been imaged, so it may well have larger craters.
Pluto (dwarf planet)	Sputnik Planitia basin	ca. 1,400 × 1,200 km average: ~1,300 km	2,377 km	54.7%		Partially infilled by convecting Nitrogen ice, heavily eroded
Pluto (dwarf planet)	Burney	296 km (184 mi)	2,377 km	12.5%		Heavily degraded, difficult to see
Charon (moon of Pluto)	Dorothy	ca. 261 km (162 mi)	1,207 km	21%		Crater at upper right overlapping Mordor Macula
Máni (trans-Neptunian object)	unnamed	322±39 km	796±24 km	40%		The 8 August 2020 occultation showed that there is a crater-like depression 323 km wide and 45.1 km deep along Máni's northeastern outline, or limb, though this crater-like depression remains unconfirmed.

== See also ==
- List of Solar System extremes
  - List of largest lakes and seas in the Solar System
  - List of largest rifts and valleys in the Solar System
  - List of tallest mountains in the Solar System
