= Saturnalia Fossae =

Parallel trough on Vesta named after Saturnalia

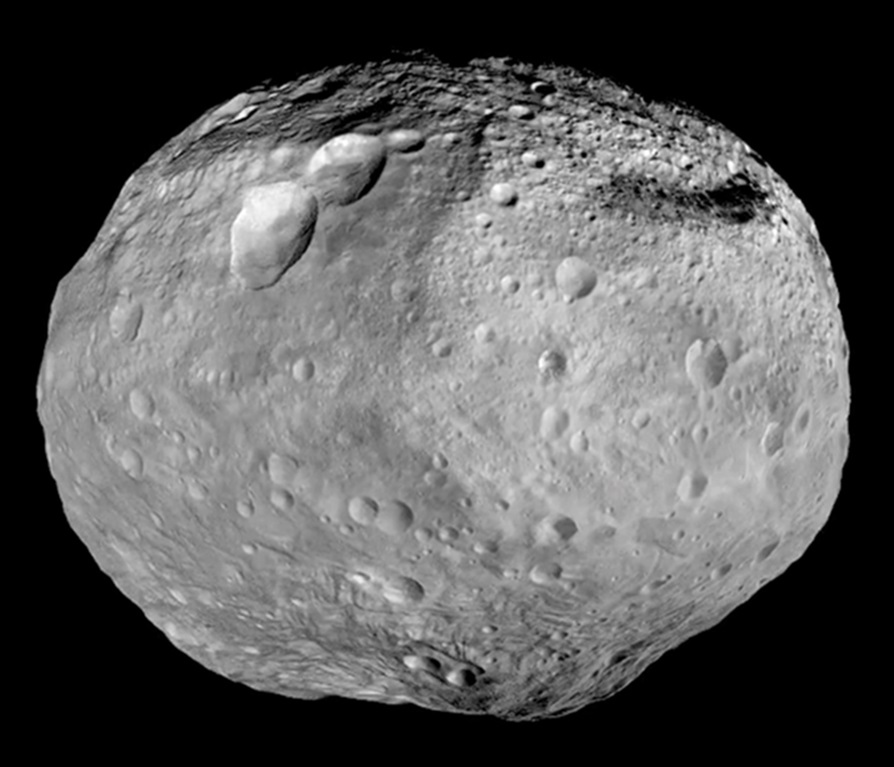
- Saturnalia Fossae runs obliquely near the terminator at upper right of this full view of Vesta, with nearby grooves parallel to it
- Feature type: Trough system
- Location: Northern hemisphere, 4 Vesta
- Coordinates: 28°3′N 37°3′E
- Length: 344.94 km
- Discoverer: Dawn
- Eponym: Saturnalia

Saturnalia Fossae /sætərˈneɪliə ˈfɒsə/ is a series of parallel Veneneian troughs in the northern hemisphere of the giant asteroid 4 Vesta. It is thought to be a shock fractures resulting from the impact that created Veneneia crater, which it is concentric with. It is one of the longer chasms in the Solar System.

== Observation and naming ==
Saturnalia Fossae, as with most Vestian features, was first observed upon the arrival of the Dawn orbiter in July 2011. Initially, only the largest and most prominent trough was named, then called Saturnalia Fossa. Later, the name came to encompass all troughs in the network, with the largest trough later being designated Saturnalia Fossa A. The trough system is named after the Roman festival of Saturnalia; the name Saturnalia Fossae was officially approved by the International Astronomical Union (IAU) on 27 December 2011.

== Geology and characteristics ==
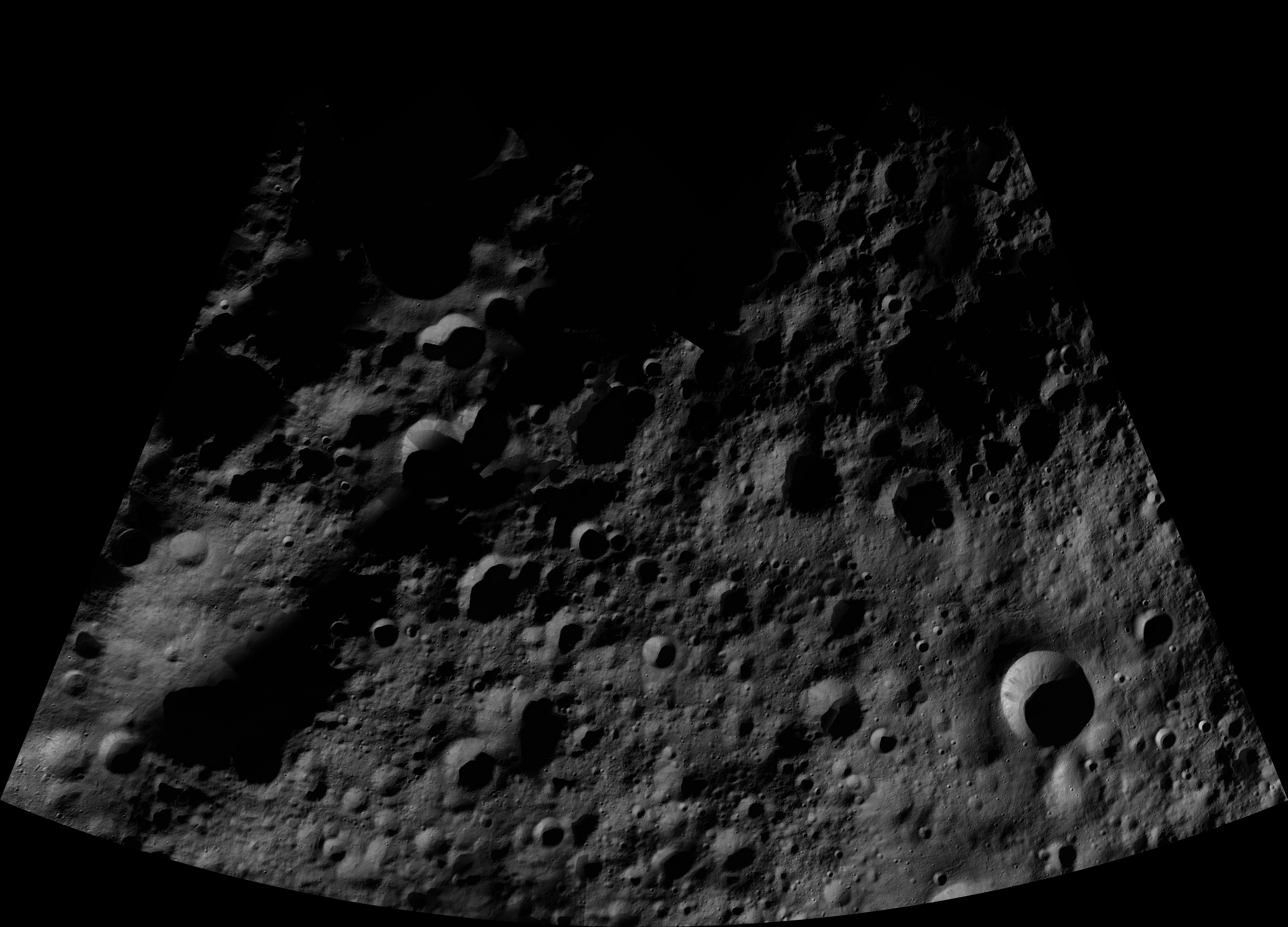
A composite image of the Domitia quadrangle, hosting some of the troughs that compose Saturnalia Fossae

Saturnalia Fossae is located in Vesta's northern hemisphere. It is one of two major trough systems, with the other being Divalia Fossae along much of Vesta's equator. The troughs of Saturnalia Fossae are parallel and oriented northwest to southeast, at an angle of roughly 30° to the troughs of Divalia Fossae and generally concentric to the large Veneneia impact basin. The largest trough, Saturnalia Fossae A, is approximately 390 kilometers long, 39.2 kilometers wide, and 4 kilometers deep. A further seven other major troughs range between 21 and 212 kilometers in length. Saturnalia Fossae is the older of the two trough systems, as its southernmost extent is superseded by Divalia Fossae; estimates using crater counting place Saturnalia Fossae's age at roughly 3.6–3.7 billion years old. As such, Saturnalia Fossae is comparatively more degraded, with rounded edges, shallower walls, and heavier cratering than Divalia Fossae.

== See also ==
- Divalia Fossae – A similar equatorial system of troughs on Vesta
