= Veneneia (crater) =

Impact crater on 4 Vesta

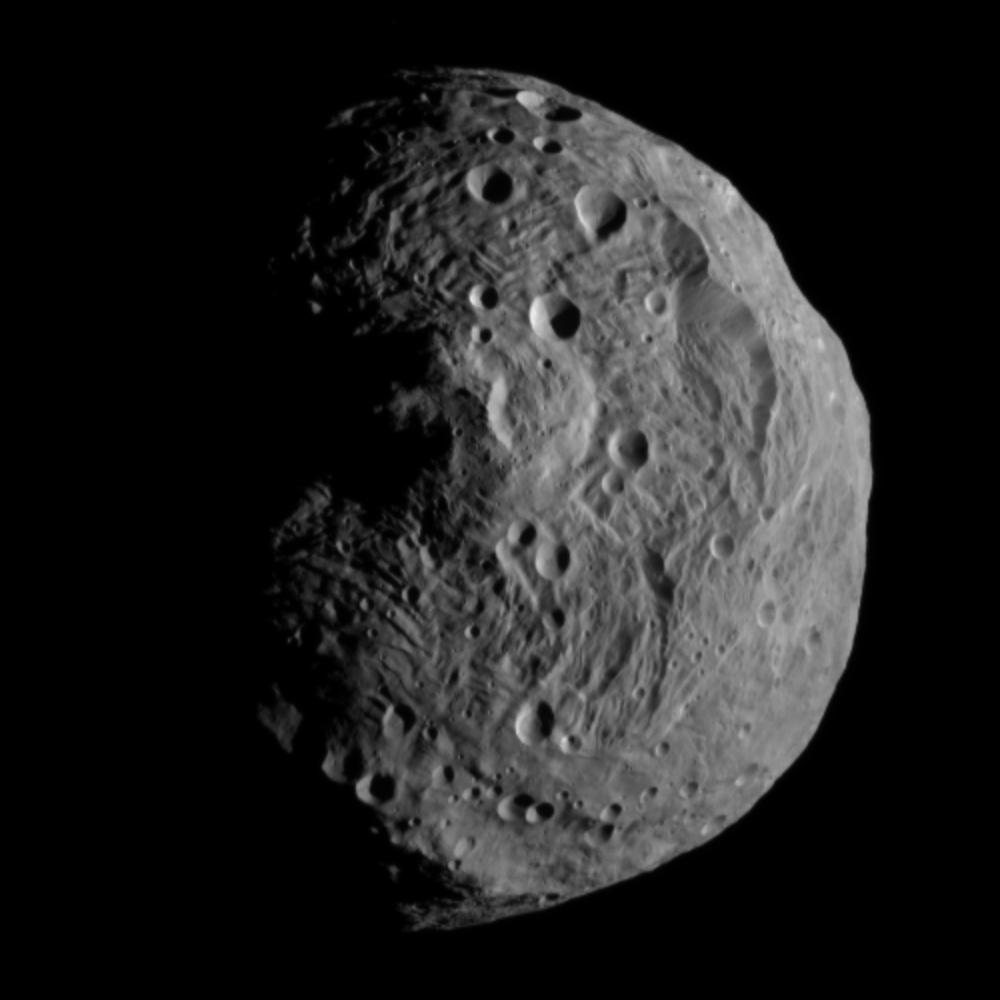
- Southern hemisphere of Vesta as imaged by Dawn, showing Veneneia
- Location: Vesta
- Coordinates: 52°S latitude
- Diameter: c. 395 km
- Age: c. 3.1 billion years
- Discoverer: Dawn in 2011

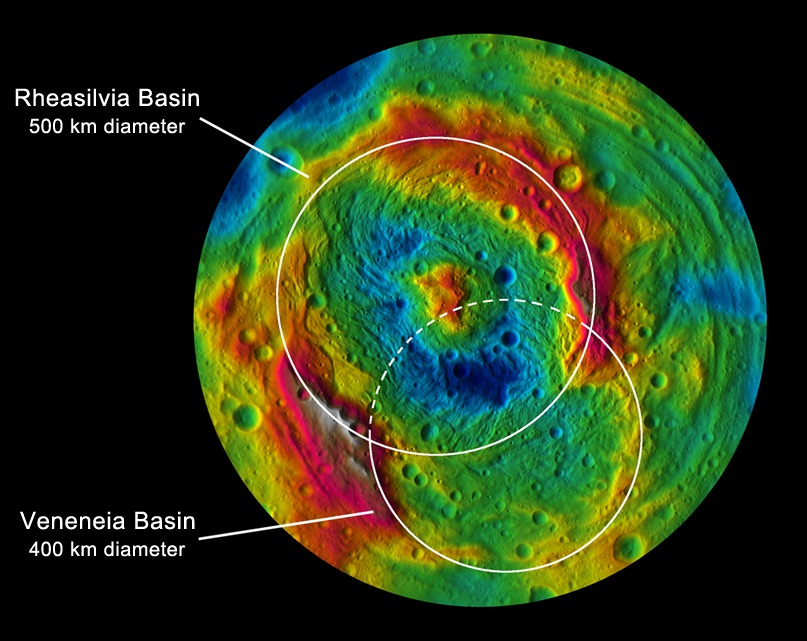

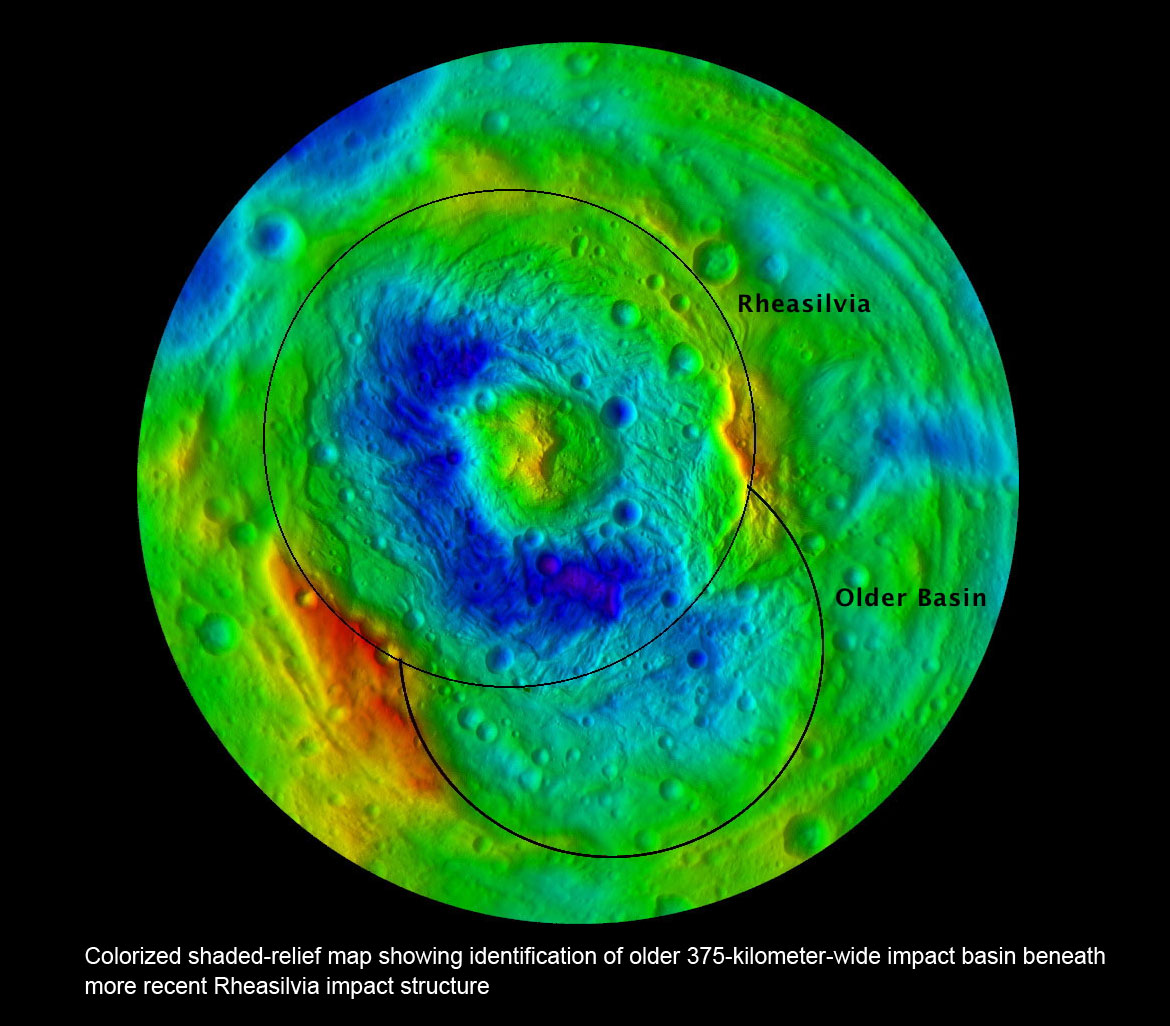
Outline of Rheasilvia (top center), with Veneneia (bottom center) underlying it

Veneneia /vɛnɪˈniːə/ is the second-largest impact crater on the asteroid Vesta, at 52°S latitude. 395 kilometres (245 mi) in diameter, it is 70% of the equatorial diameter of the asteroid, and one of the largest craters in the Solar System. It is at least 2 billion years old, and possibly as old as 4.2 billion years. However, it is overlain and partially obliterated by the even larger Rheasilvia. It was discovered by the Dawn spacecraft in 2011. It is named after Venēneia, one of the founding vestal virgins.

Vesta has a series of troughs in the northern hemisphere concentric to Veneneia. These are believed to be large-scale fractures resulting from the impact. The largest is Saturnalia Fossae, around 39 km wide and > 400 km long.
