= Rheasilvia =

Impact crater on the surface of the asteroid 4 Vesta

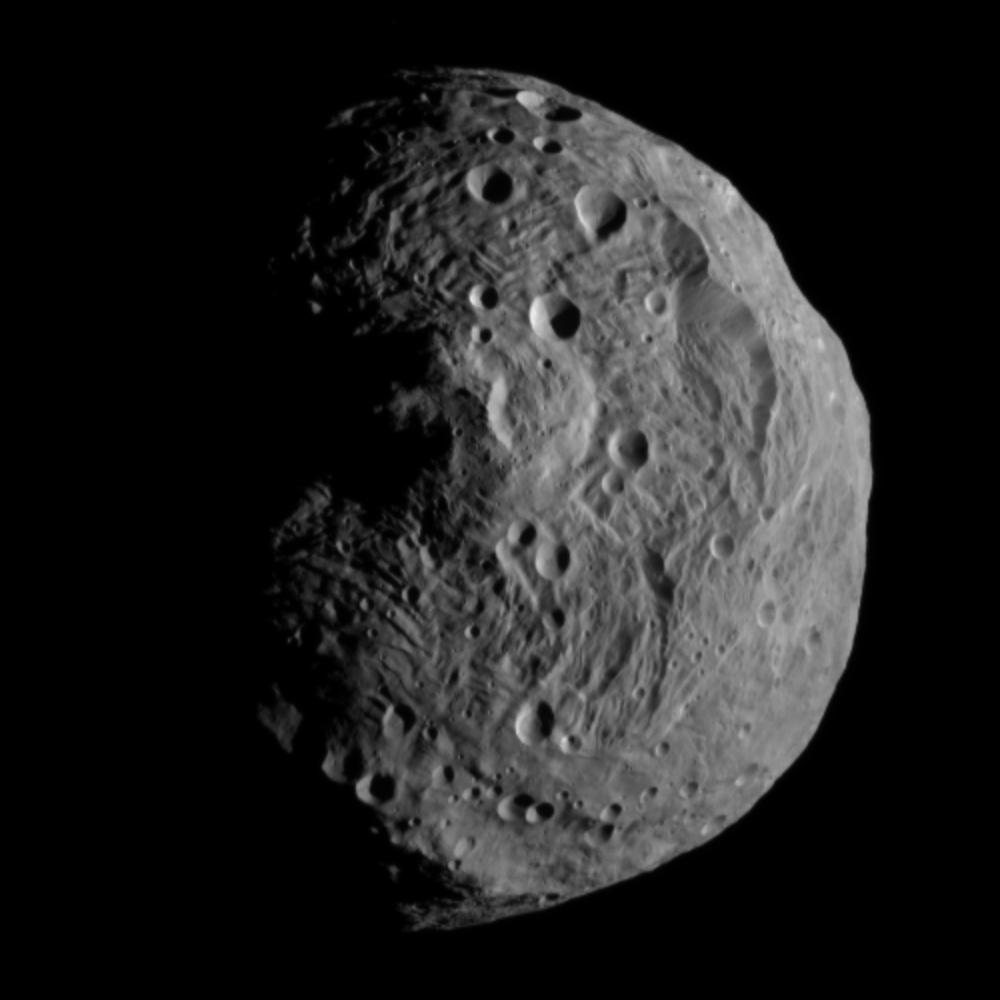
- Southern hemisphere of Vesta as imaged by Dawn, showing Rheasilvia
- Location: Vesta
- Coordinates: 71°57′S 86°18′E
- Diameter: c. 505 km (314 mi)
- Peak: 19–22 km (12–14 mi) (central peak)
- Age: c. 1 billion years
- Discoverer: Hubble Space Telescope in 1997
- Eponym: Rhea Silvia, a mythological vestal virgin and mother of the founders of Rome, Romulus and Remus

Rheasilvia /ˌriːəˈsɪlviə/ is the largest impact crater on the asteroid Vesta. It is 505 km (314 mi) in diameter, which is 90% the diameter of Vesta itself, and is 95% the mean diameter of Vesta, 529 km (329 mi). However, the mean is affected by the crater itself. It is 89% the mean equatorial diameter of 569 km (354 mi), making it one of the largest craters in the Solar System, and at 75°S latitude, covers most of the southern hemisphere. The peak in the center of the crater is 200 km (120 mi) in diameter, and rises 19–22 km (12–14 mi; 62,000–72,000 ft) from its base, making it one of the tallest mountains known in the Solar System.

== Observation and naming ==
Rheasilvia was discovered in Hubble Space Telescope images in 1997, but was not named until the arrival of the Dawn spacecraft in 2011. It is named after Rhea Silvia, a mythological vestal virgin and mother of the founders of Rome, Romulus and Remus. The name Rheasilvia was officially approved by the International Astronomical Union (IAU) on 30 September 2011.

== Characteristics ==
The crater partially obscures an earlier crater, named Veneneia, that at 395 km (245 mi) is almost as large.

Rheasilvia has an escarpment along part of its perimeter which rises 4–12 km (2.5–7.5 mi) above the surrounding terrain. The crater floor lies about 13 kilometres (8.1 mi) below the surrounding surface. This basin consists of undulating terrain and a central mound almost 200 km (120 mi) in diameter, which rises 20–25 km (12–16 mi; 66,000–82,000 ft) from its base, one of the tallest known mountains in the Solar System, and possibly formed due to a planetary scale impact.

Spectroscopic analyses of the Hubble images have shown that this crater has penetrated deep through several distinct layers of the crust, and possibly into the mantle, as indicated by spectral signatures of olivine.

Vesta has a series of troughs in an equatorial region concentric to Rheasilvia. These are thought to be large-scale fractures resulting from the impact. The largest is Divalia Fossae, approx. 22 km (14 mi) wide and 465 km (289 mi) long.

It is estimated that the impact responsible excavated about 1% of the volume of Vesta, and it is likely that the Vesta family and V-type asteroids are the products of this collision. If this is the case, then the fact that 10-km fragments have survived bombardment until the present indicates that the crater is at most about 1 billion years old. It would also be the origin of the HED meteorites. Known V-type asteroids account for 6% of the ejected volume, with the rest of the fragments presumably either too small to observe, or removed from the asteroid belt by approaching the 3:1 Kirkwood gap, by the Yarkovsky effect, or (in the case of small fragments) by radiation pressure.

== Gallery ==
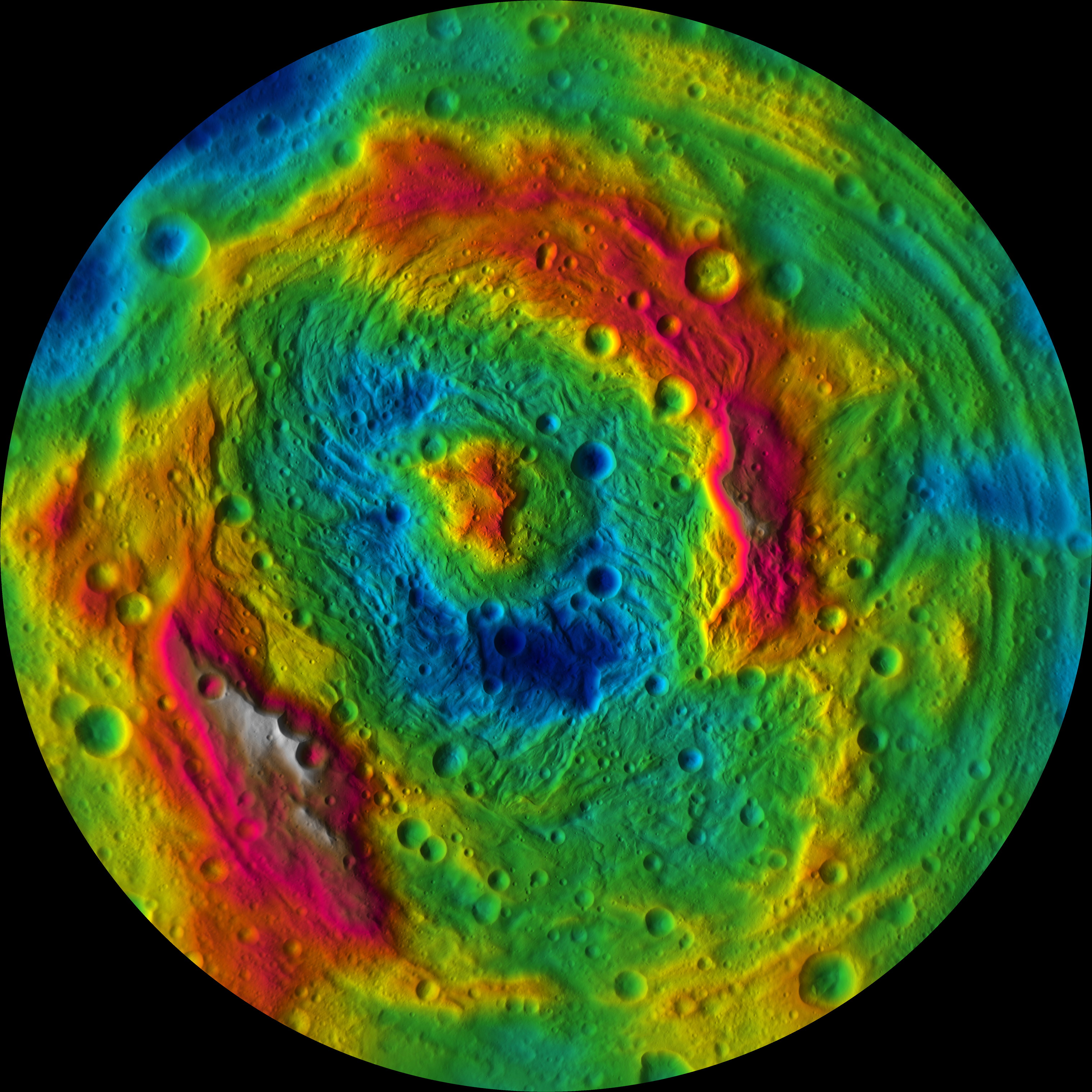
Elevation map of Vesta's southern hemisphere. Higher elevations (red) are found on the crater rim (occluding Veneneia) and the central peak.

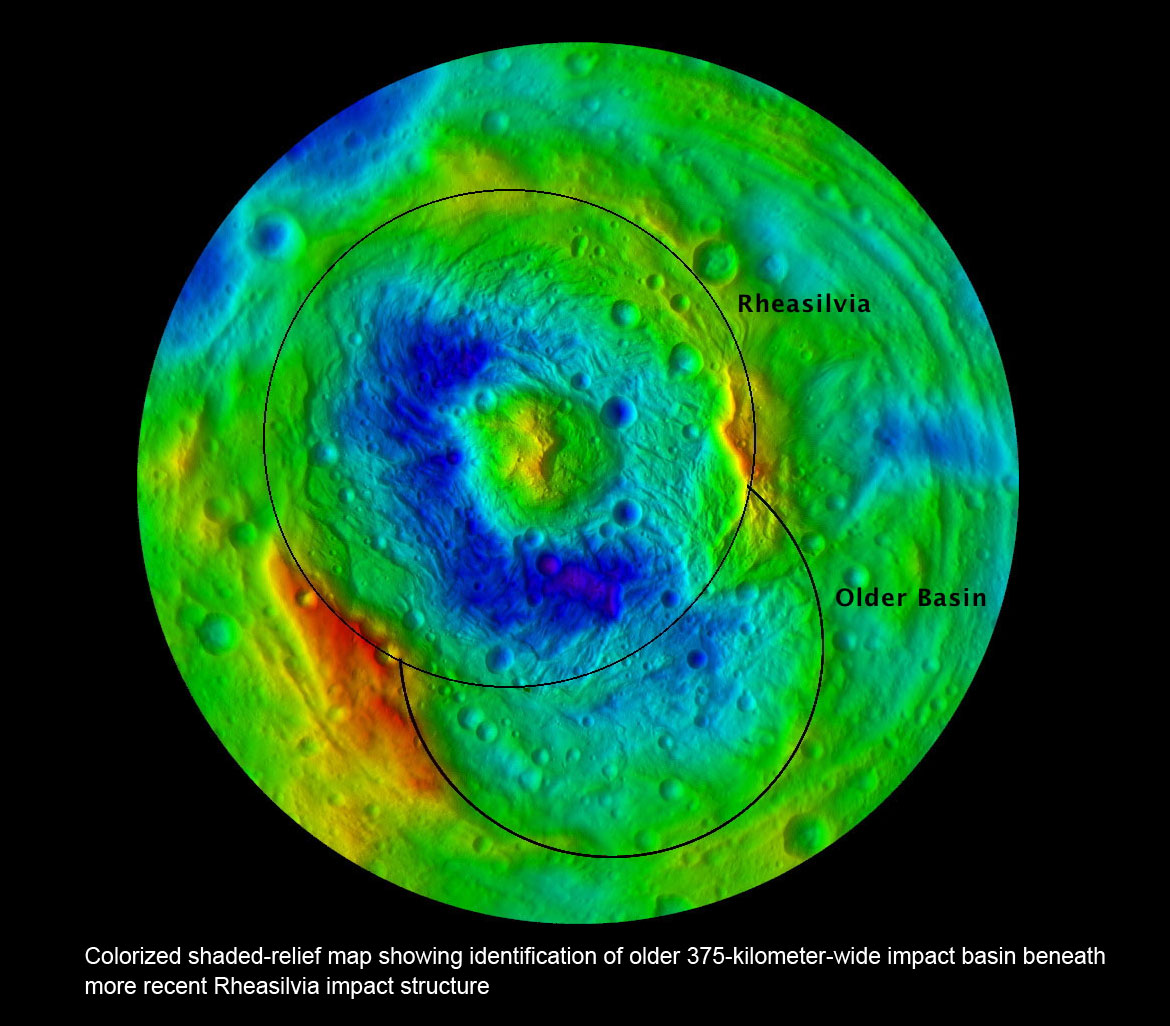
Outlines of Rheasilvia and Veneneia, the latter being partially obliterated by the former.

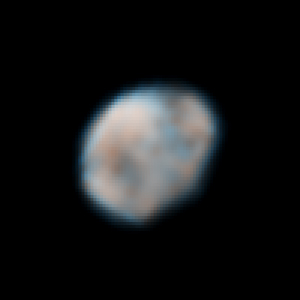
Hubble image of Vesta from May 2007. The flat spot at lower right is Rheasilvia seen in profile.

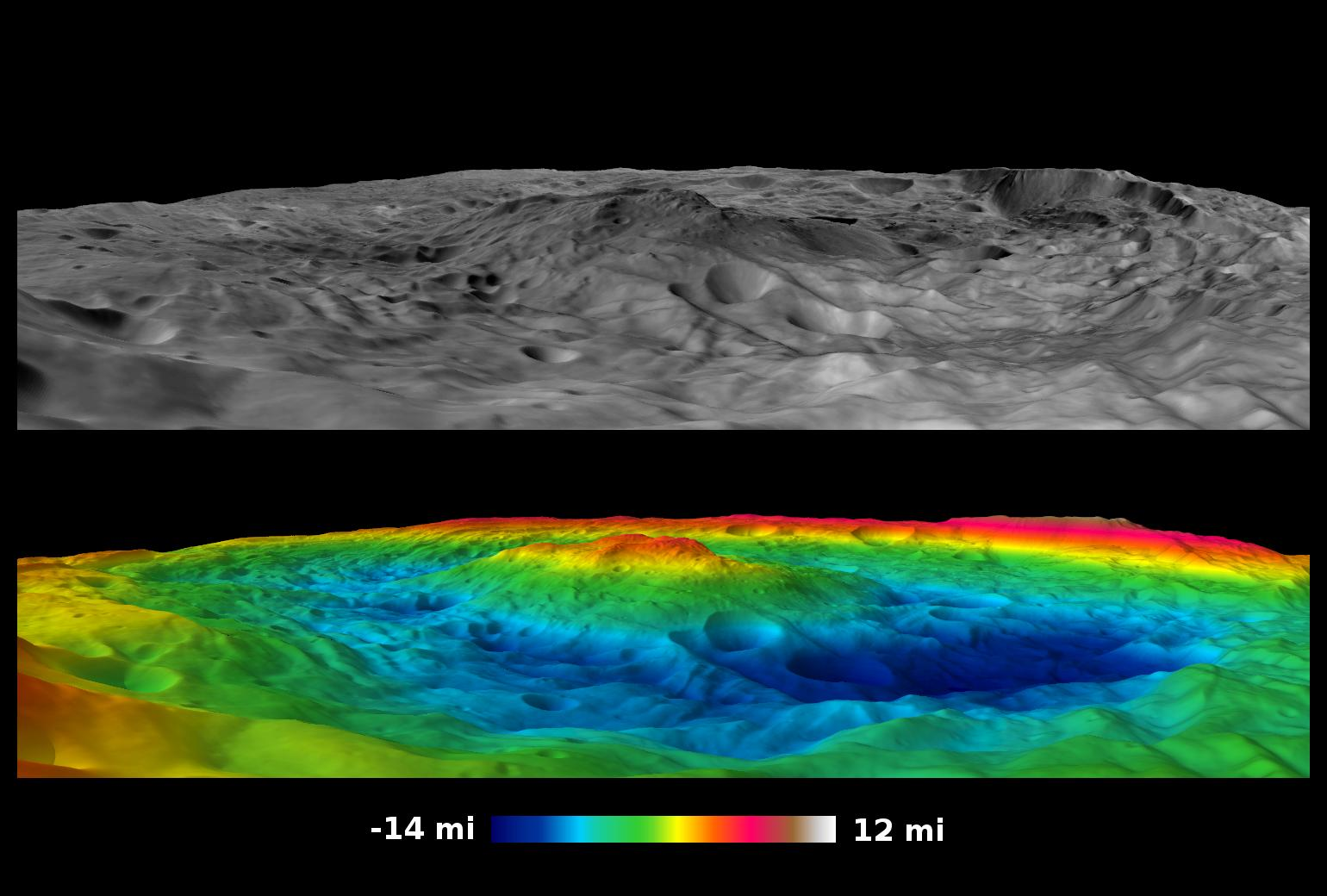
Computer-generated oblique view of Rheasilvia, with color-coded elevation in the lower version. A flyover video is available at the source.

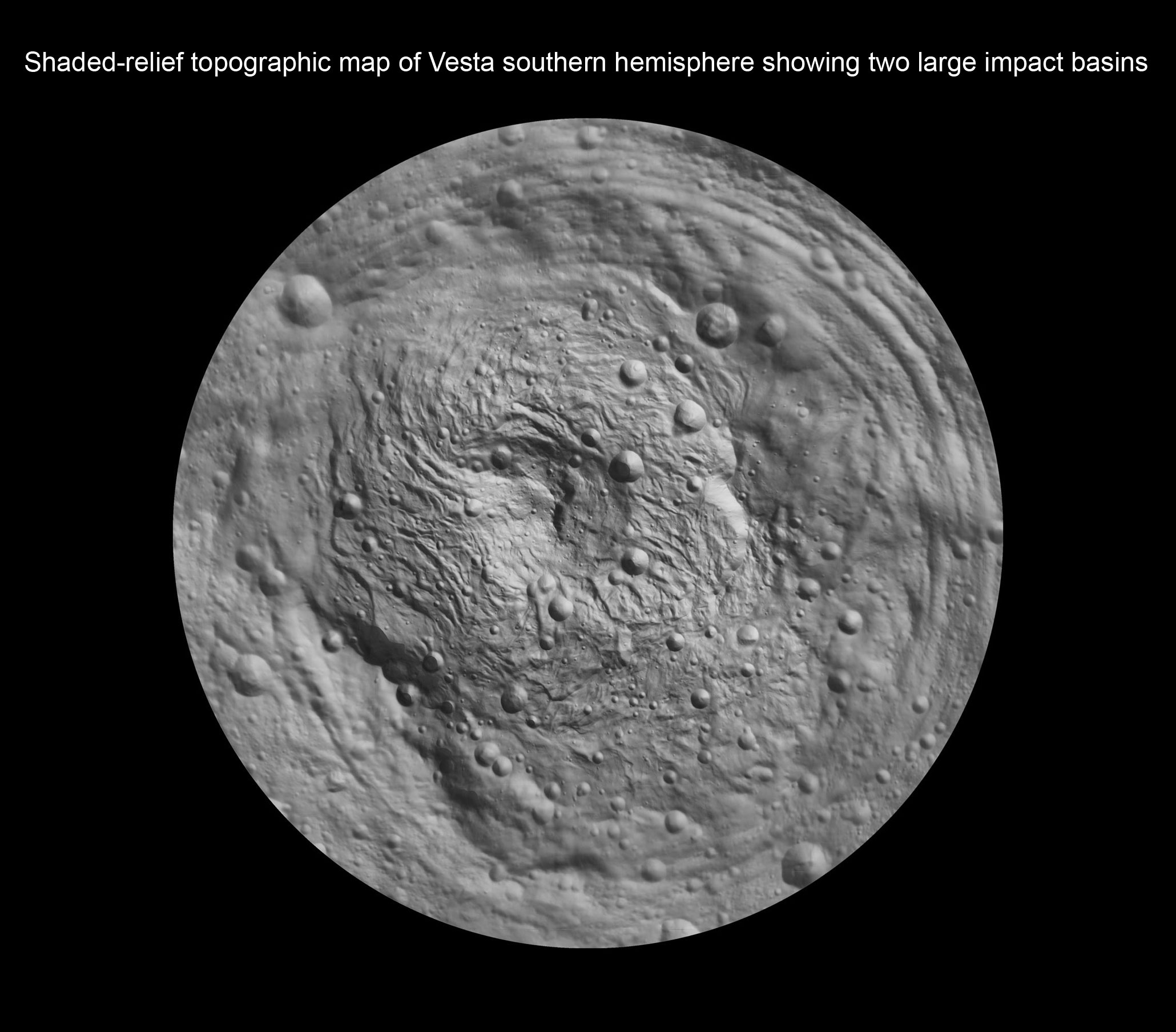
Shaded-relief topographic map of Vesta's southern hemisphere, showing Rheasilvia and Veneneia

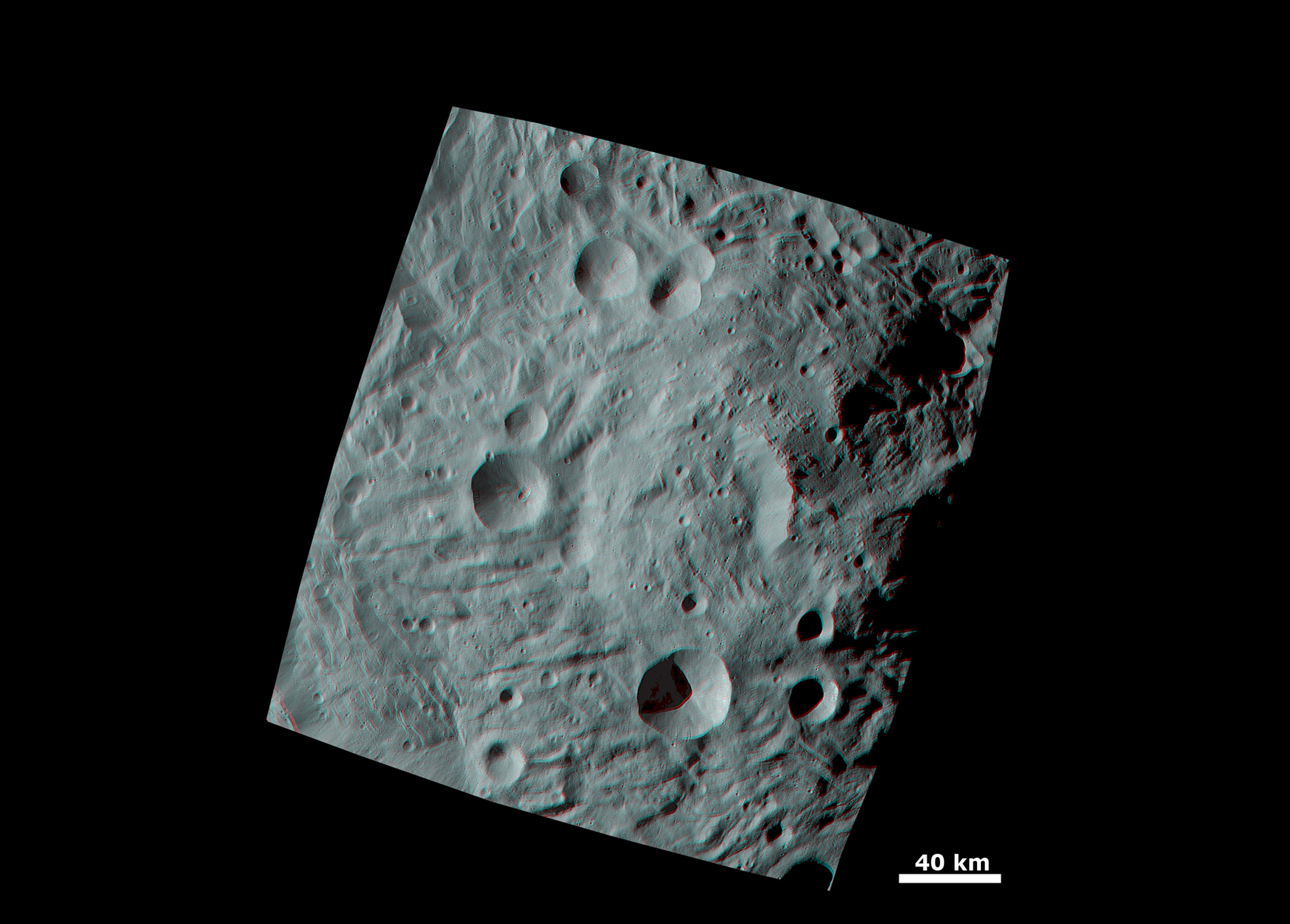
3-D anaglyph image of Rheasilvia's central peak. 3D red cyan glasses are recommended to view this image correctly.

== See also ==
- List of largest craters in the Solar System
- List of tallest mountains in the Solar System
- Lists of astronomical objects
