= Mountain range =

Geographic area containing several geologically related mountains

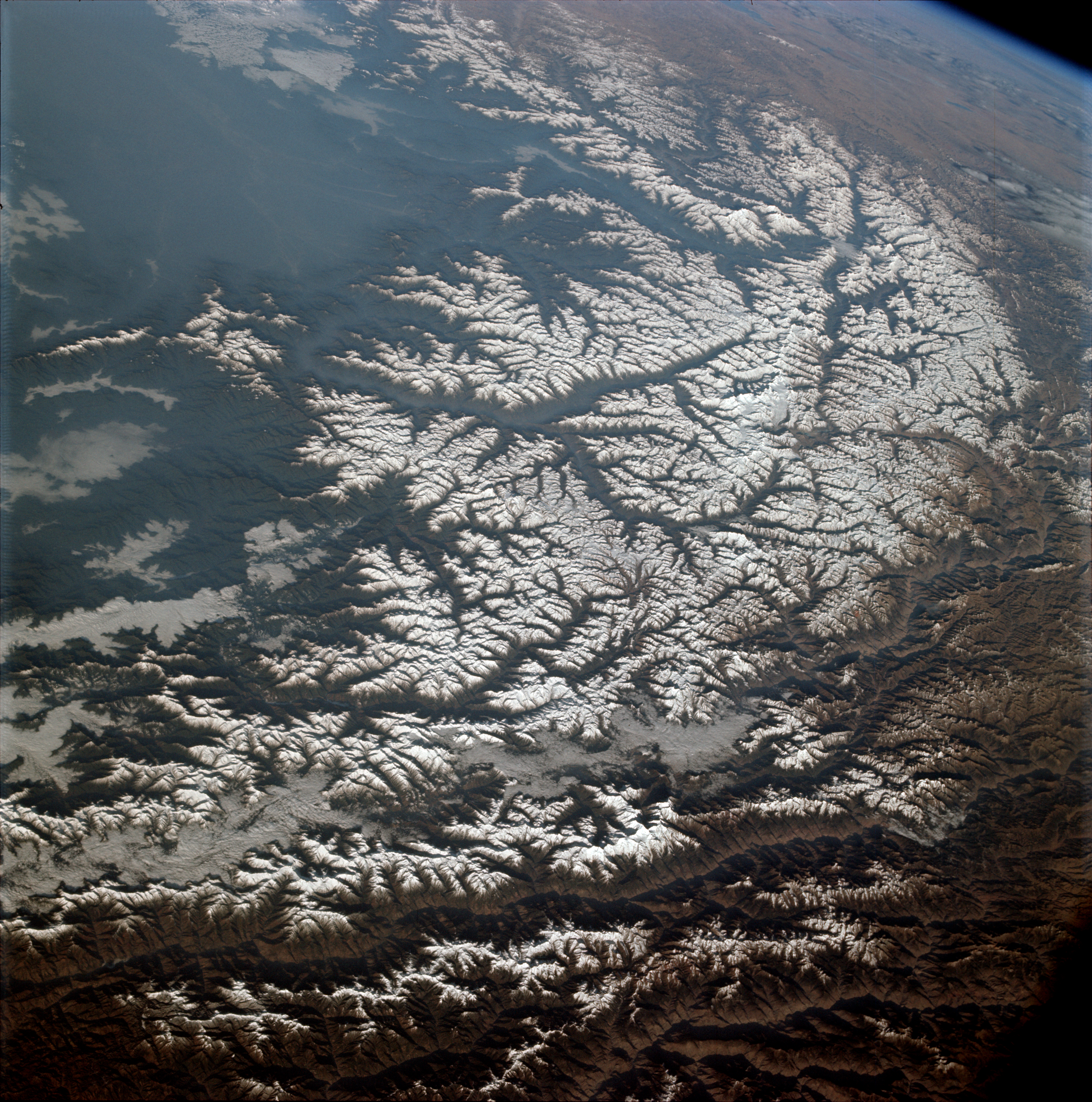
The Namcha Barwa Himal, east part of the Himalayas as seen from space by Apollo 9

A mountain range or hill range is a series of mountains or hills arranged in a line and connected by high ground. A mountain system or mountain belt is a group of mountain ranges with similarity in form, structure, and alignment that have arisen from the same cause, usually an orogeny. Mountain ranges are formed by a variety of geological processes, but most of the significant ones on Earth are the result of plate tectonics. Mountain ranges are also found on many planetary mass objects in the Solar System and are likely a feature of most terrestrial planets.

Mountain ranges are usually segmented by highlands or mountain passes and valleys. Individual mountains within the same mountain range do not necessarily have the same geologic structure or petrology. They may be a mix of different orogenic expressions and terranes, for example thrust sheets, uplifted blocks, fold mountains, and volcanic landforms resulting in a variety of rock types.

== Major ranges ==
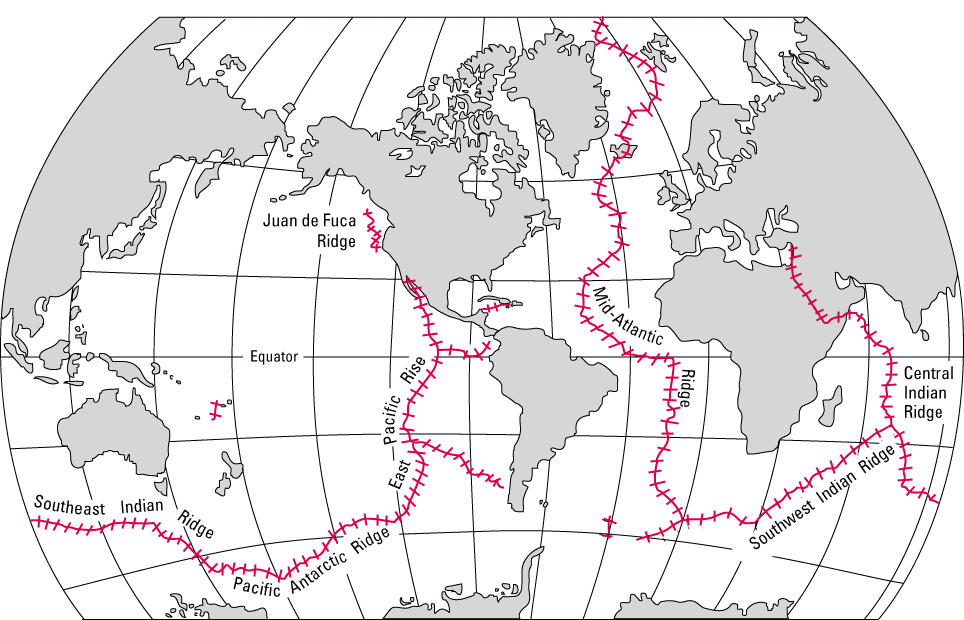
The Ocean Ridge, the world's longest mountain range (chain)

Most geologically young mountain ranges on the Earth's land surface are associated with either the Pacific Ring of Fire or the Alpide belt. The Pacific Ring of Fire includes the Andes of South America, extends through the North American Cordillera, the Aleutian Range, on through Kamchatka Peninsula, Japan, China, the Philippines, Papua New Guinea, to New Zealand. The Andes are 7,000 kilometres (4,350 mi) long and is often considered the world's longest mountain system. It runs along the South America's Western side passing through countries like Colombia, Ecuador, Peru, Bolivia, Argentina and Chile.

The Alpide belt stretches 15,000 km across southern Eurasia, from Java in Maritime Southeast Asia to the Iberian Peninsula in Western Europe, including the ranges of the Himalayas, Karakoram, Hindu Kush, Alborz, Caucasus, and the Alps. The Himalayas contain the highest mountains in the world, including Mount Everest, which is 8,848 metres (29,029 ft) high.

Mountain ranges outside these two systems include the Arctic Cordillera, Appalachians, Great Dividing Range, East Siberians, Altais, Scandinavians, Qinling, Western Ghats, Vindhyas, Byrrangas, and the Annamite Range. If the definition of a mountain range is stretched to include underwater mountains, then the Ocean Ridge forms the longest continuous mountain system on Earth, with a length of 65,000 kilometres (40,400 mi).

== Climate ==
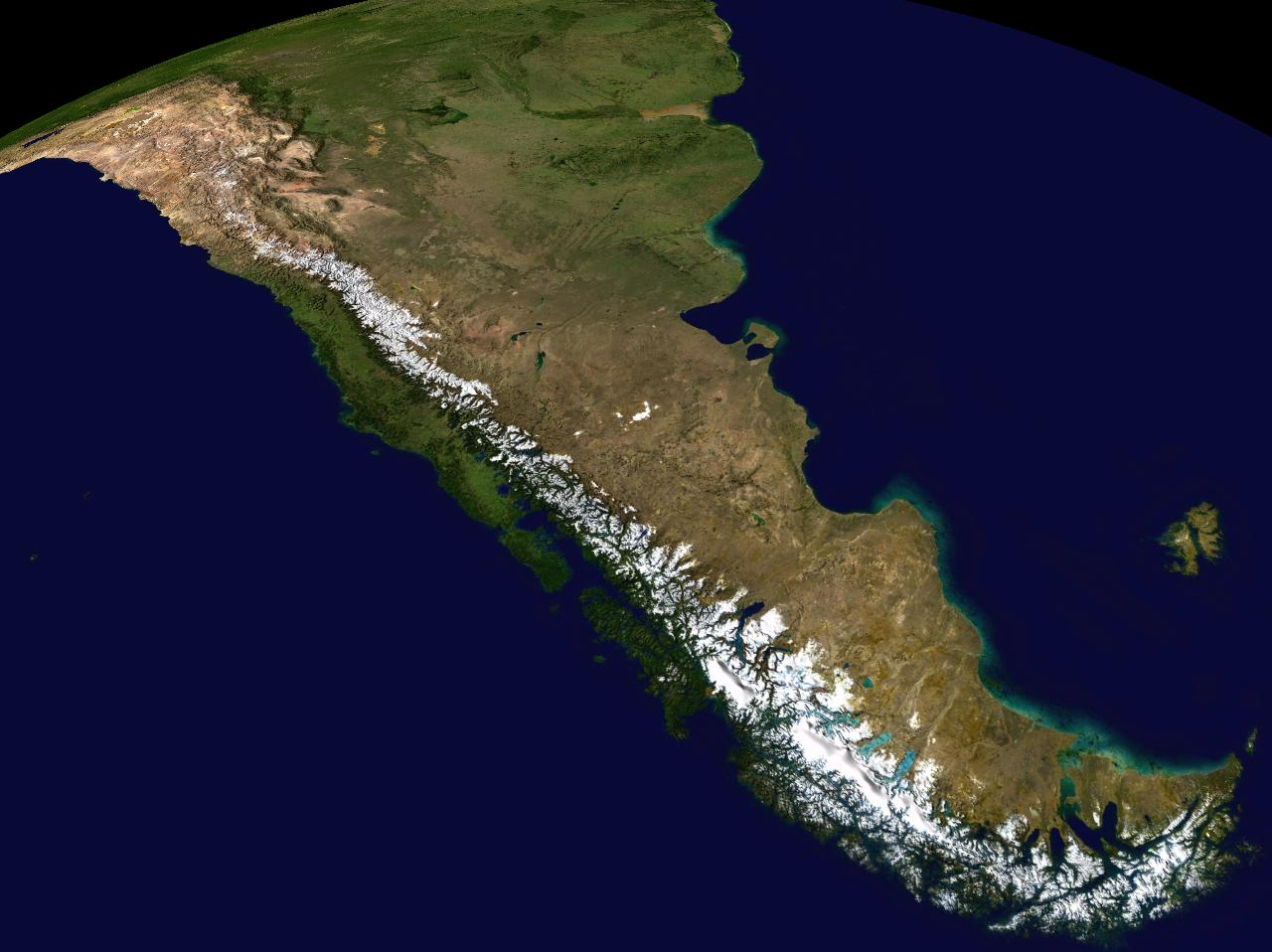
The Andes, the longest mountain range on the surface of the Earth, have a dramatic impact on the climate of South America

The position of mountain ranges influences climate, such as rain or snow. When air masses move up and over mountains, the air cools, producing orographic precipitation (rain or snow). As the air descends on the leeward side, it warms again (following the adiabatic lapse rate) and is drier, having been stripped of much of its moisture. Often, a rain shadow will affect the leeward side of a range. As a consequence, large mountain ranges, such as the Andes, compartmentalize continents into distinct climate regions.

== Erosion ==
Mountain ranges are constantly subjected to erosional forces which work to tear them down. The basins adjacent to an eroding mountain range are then filled with sediments that are buried and turned into sedimentary rock. Erosion is at work while the mountains are being uplifted until the mountains are reduced to low hills and plains.

The early Cenozoic uplift of the Rocky Mountains of Colorado provides an example. As the uplift was occurring some 10,000 feet (3,000 m) of mostly Mesozoic sedimentary strata were removed by erosion over the core of the mountain range and spread as sand and clays across the Great Plains to the east. This mass of rock was removed as the range was actively undergoing uplift. The removal of such a mass from the core of the range most likely caused further uplift as the region adjusted isostatically in response to the removed weight.

Rivers are traditionally believed to be the principal cause of mountain range erosion, by cutting into bedrock and transporting sediment. Computer simulation has shown that as mountain belts change from tectonically active to inactive, the rate of erosion drops because there are fewer abrasive particles in the water and fewer landslides.

== Extraterrestrial "Montes" ==
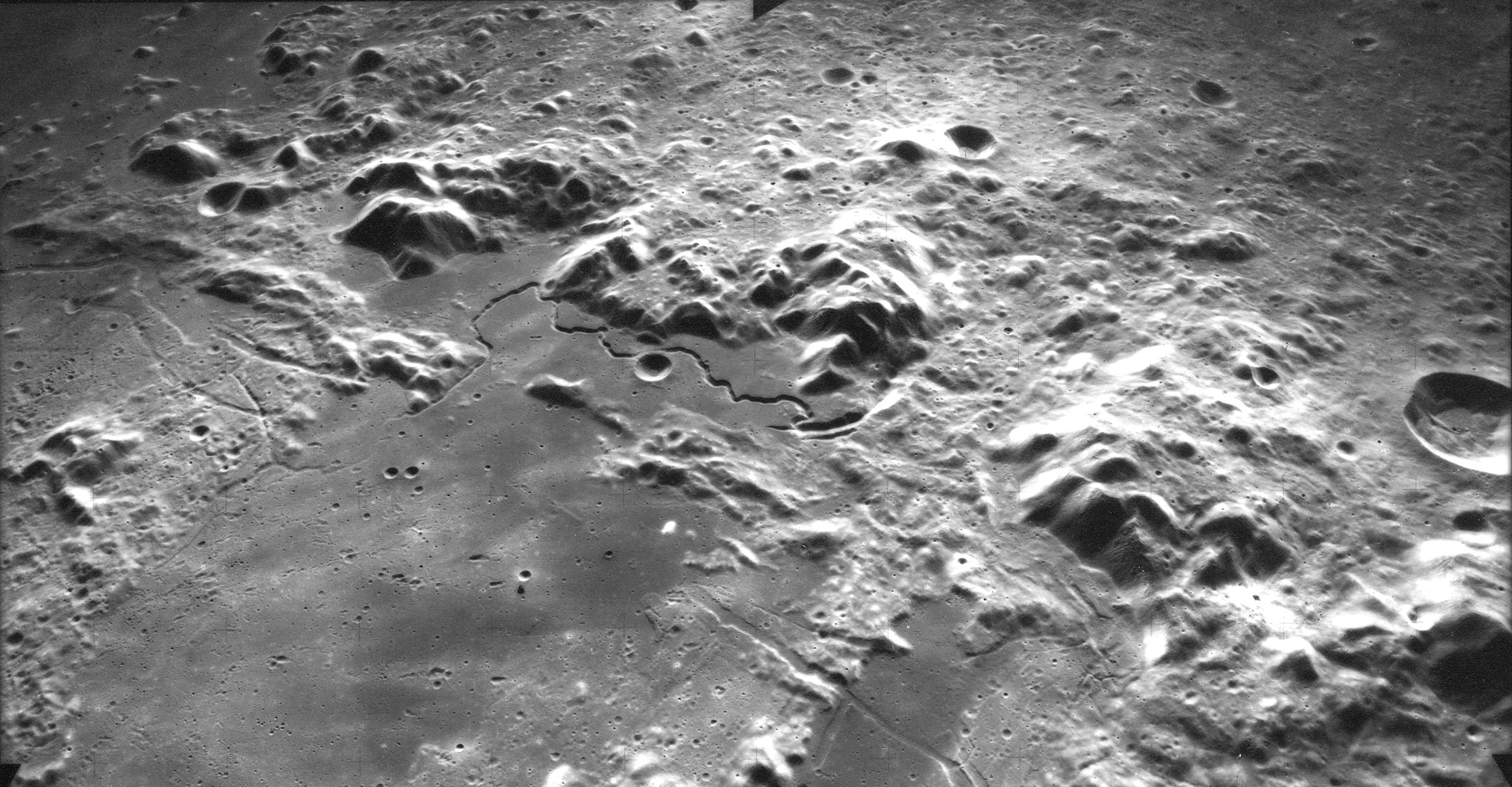
Montes Apenninus on the Moon was formed by an impact event.

Mountains on other planets and natural satellites of the Solar System, including the Moon, are often isolated and formed mainly by processes such as impacts, though there are examples of mountain ranges (or "Montes") somewhat similar to those on Earth. Saturn's moon Titan and Pluto, in particular, exhibit large mountain ranges in chains composed mainly of ices rather than rock. Examples include the Mithrim Montes and Doom Mons on Titan, and Tenzing Montes and Hillary Montes on Pluto. Some terrestrial planets other than Earth also exhibit rocky mountain ranges, such as Maxwell Montes on Venus taller than any on Earth and Tartarus Montes on Mars. Jupiter's moon Io has mountain ranges formed from tectonic processes including the Boösaule, Dorian, Hi'iaka and Euboea Montes.

== See also ==
- Cordillera
- Drainage divide
- List of mountain ranges
- Category:Lists of mountain ranges
- List of mountain types
- Lists of mountains
- Massif
- Mountain chain
- Mountain formation
- Ridge – an elongated mountain or hill, or chain of them
