= Dorothy =

Dorothy may refer to:

- Dorothy (given name), a list of people with that name.

== Arts and entertainment ==
=== Film and television ===
- Dorothy (film), 2026 Indian film
- Dorothy (TV series), 1979 American TV series
- Dorothy Mills, a 2008 French movie, sometimes titled simply Dorothy

=== Music ===
- Dorothy (band), a Los Angeles-based rock band
- Dorothy (band), a disbanded Hungarian rock band
- Dorothy, the title of an Old English dance and folk song by Seymour Smith
- "Dorothy", a 2019 song by Sulli
- "Dorothy", a 2016 song by Her's

=== In other media ===
- Dorothy (opera), a comic opera (1886) by Stephenson & Cellier
- Dorothy (Chase), a 1902 painting by William Merritt Chase
- Dorothy (comic book), a comic book based on the Wizard of Oz
- Dorothy, a publishing project, an American publisher

== Places ==
- Dorothy, Alberta, a hamlet in the Canadian province of Alberta
- Dorothy, New Jersey, an unincorporated community and census-designated place in New Jersey, United States
- Dorothy, West Virginia, an unincorporated community in West Virginia, United States
- Dorothy (Venusian crater)
- Dorothy (Charonian crater)

== Nautical ==
- Dorothy (1815 ship), an English merchant ship
- USS Dorothy (SP-1289), a United States Navy patrol boat in commission from 1917 to 1918
- ST Dorothy, A Malaysian tug in service 1958–75

== See also ==
- Friend of Dorothy, archaic crypto-euphemism for "gay"
- Hurricane Dorothy (disambiguation)
- Dorothea (disambiguation)
- Dorothee (given name), an alternate spelling to Dorothy
- Dorothy, an Iowa-based tornado interceptor built by the Iowa Storm Chasing Network (ISCN) in 2014
