= Dorothea (disambiguation) =

Dorothea is a feminine given name.

== Places ==
- 339 Dorothea, an asteroid
- Dorothea, U.S. Virgin Islands, a settlement
- Dorothea Quarry, a flooded quarry in the Nantlle Valley, Gwynedd, Wales
- Fort Dorothea, a late 17th-early 18th century settlement on the Brandenburger Gold Coast in west Africa
- Dorothea, the former German name for the village of Doroteia, an associated village of Frasin, Suceava county, Romania

== Ships ==
- HMS Santa Dorothea (1798), frigate
- USS Dorothea (1898), gunboat
- USS Dorothea L. Dix (AP-67), transport ship

== Other uses ==
- "Dorothea" (song), a 2020 song by Taylor Swift
- Dorothea (film), a 2025 crime horror film by Chad Ferrin

== See also ==
- Dorotea Municipality, Västerbotten County, Sweden
  - Dorotea, seat of the municipality
- Dorothy (disambiguation)
- Dorothee (given name)
- Sophia Dorothea
- Thea (name)
- Tea (given name)
