= List of tallest mountains in the Solar System =

Olympus Mons, the tallest planetary mountain in the Solar System, compared to Mount Everest and Mauna Kea on Earth (heights shown are above datum or sea level, which differ from the base-to-peak heights given in the list).

This is a list of the tallest mountains in the Solar System. This list includes peaks on all celestial bodies where significant mountains have been detected. For some celestial bodies, different peaks are given across different types of measurement. The Solar System's tallest mountain is possibly the Olympus Mons on Mars with an altitude of 21.9 to 26 km. The central peak of Rheasilvia on the asteroid Vesta is also a candidate to be the tallest, with an estimated height between 19 and 22 km from peak to base. A 25 km tall mountain-like peak was detected via an occultation on the trans-Neptunian object 307261 Máni, qualifying it as one of the tallest known mountains in the Solar System, though it is unclear whether this feature is a genuine topographic peak or an occulting satellite.

== List ==
Heights are given from base to peak (although a precise definition for mean base level is lacking). Peak elevations above sea level are only available on Earth, and possibly Titan. On other planets, peak elevations above an equipotential surface or a reference ellipsoid could be used if enough data is available for the calculation, but this is often not the case.

Planet	Tallest peak(s)	Base-to-peak height	% of radius (Note: 100 × ratio of peak height to radius of the parent world)	Origin	Notes
Mercury	Caloris Montes	≤ 3 km (1.9 mi)	0.12	impact	Formed by the Caloris impact
Venus	Maxwell Montes (Note: Until 2025, Skadi Mons was designated as the highest peak of Maxwell Montes. It was subsequently dropped when radar data suggested there was no mons feature at the location.)	6.4 km (4.0 mi) (11 km above mean)	0.11	tectonic	Has radar-bright slopes due to metallic Venus snow, possibly lead sulfide
Venus	Maat Mons	4.9 km (3.0 mi) (approx.)	0.081	volcanic	Highest volcano on Venus
Earth (Note: On Earth, mountain heights are constrained by glaciation; peaks are usually limited to elevations not more than 1500 m above the snow line (which varies with latitude). Exceptions to this trend tend to be rapidly forming volcanoes.)	Mauna Kea and Mauna Loa	10.2 km (6.3 mi)	0.16	volcanic	4.2 km (2.6 mi) of this is above sea level
Earth	Haleakalā	9.1 km (5.7 mi)	0.14	volcanic	Rises 3.1 km above sea level
Earth	Pico del Teide	7.5 km (4.7 mi)	0.12	volcanic	Rises 3.7 km above sea level
Earth	Denali (Mount McKinley)	5.3 to 5.9 km (3.3 to 3.7 mi)	0.093	tectonic	Tallest mountain base-to-peak on land (Note: On p. 20 of Helman (2005): "the base to peak rise of Mount McKinley is the largest of any mountain that lies entirely above sea level, some 18,000 ft (5,500 m)")
Earth	Mount Everest	3.6 to 4.6 km (2.2 to 2.9 mi)	0.072	tectonic	4.6 km on north face, 3.6 km on south face; (Note: Peak is 8.8 km (5.5 mi) above sea level, and over 13 km (8.1 mi) above the oceanic abyssal plain.) highest elevation (8.8 km) above sea level, as well as by wet and dry prominence (but not among the tallest from base to peak, nor in distance to Earth's center, as Chimborazo rises highest).
Moon (Note: Prominences in crater rims are not typically viewed as peaks and have not been listed here. The highest point on the Moon is the so-called Selenean summit at 5.441°N 158.656°W, a crater rim on the lunar highland, having an elevation of 10.629 kilometres (6.605 mi). A notable example is an (officially) unnamed massif on the rim of the farside crater Zeeman that rises about 4.0 km above adjacent parts of the rim and about 7.57 km above the crater floor. The formation of the massif does not appear to be explainable simply on the basis of the impact event.)	Mons Huygens	5.3 km (3.3 mi)	0.31	impact	Formed by the Imbrium impact.
Moon	Mons Mouton	6 km (3.7 mi)	0.35	impact	Possibly formed by the South Pole-Aitken basin impact.
Moon	Southern Farside Mountain	7 km (4.3 mi)	0.40	impact	Informal name of the Moon's tallest free-standing mountain. Possibly formed by the South Pole-Aitken basin impact. Not highest lunar peak by prominence, which would be Selenean summit.
Moon	Mons Hadley	4.5 km (2.8 mi)	0.26	impact	Formed by the Imbrium impact
Moon	Mons Rümker	1.3 km (0.81 mi)	0.063	volcanic	Largest volcanic construct on the Moon
Mars	Olympus Mons	21.9–26 km (13.6–16.2 mi; 72,000–85,000 ft) (Note: Due to limitations in the accuracy of the measurements and the lack of a precise definition of "base", it is difficult to say whether the volcano Olympus Mons on Mars or the central peak of Vesta's crater Rheasilvia is the tallest mountain in the Solar System.)	0.65	volcanic	Tallest mountain in the Solar System. Rises 26 km above northern plains, (dry prominence) 1000 km away. Summit calderas are 60×80 km wide, up to 3.2 km deep; scarp around margin is up to 8 km high. A shield volcano, the mean flank slope is a modest 5.2 degrees.
Mars	Ascraeus Mons	14.9 km (9.3 mi)	0.44	volcanic	Tallest of the three Tharsis Montes
Mars	Elysium Mons	12.6 km (7.8 mi)	0.37	volcanic	Highest volcano in Elysium
Mars	Arsia Mons	11.7 km (7.3 mi)	0.35	volcanic	Summit caldera is 108 to 138 km (67 to 86 mi) across
Mars	Pavonis Mons	8.4 km (5.2 mi)	0.25	volcanic	Summit caldera is 4.8 km (3.0 mi) deep
Mars	Anseris Mons	6.2 km (3.9 mi)	0.18	impact	Among the highest nonvolcanic peaks on Mars, formed by the Hellas impact
Mars	Aeolis Mons ("Mount Sharp")	4.5 to 5.5 km (2.8 to 3.4 mi) (Note: About 5.25 km (3.26 mi) high from the perspective of the landing site of Curiosity.)	0.16	deposition and erosion (Note: A crater central peak may sit below the mound of sediment. If that sediment was deposited while the crater was flooded, the crater may have once been entirely filled before erosional processes gained the upper hand. However, if the deposition was due to katabatic winds that descend the crater walls, as suggested by reported 3 degree radial slopes of the mound's layers, the role of erosion would have been to place an upper limit on the mound's growth. Gravity measurements by Curiosity suggest the crater was never buried by sediment, consistent with the latter scenario.)	Formed from deposits in Gale crater; the MSL rover has been ascending it since November 2014.
Vesta	Rheasilvia central peak	20–22 km (12–14 mi; 66,000–72,000 ft)	8.4	impact	Almost 200 km (120 mi) wide. See also: List of largest craters in the Solar System
Ceres	Ahuna Mons	4 km (2.5 mi)	0.85	cryovolcanic	Isolated steep-sided dome in relatively smooth area; max. height of ~ 5 km on steepest side; roughly antipodal to largest impact basin on Ceres
Io	Boösaule Montes "South"	17.5 to 18.2 km (10.9 to 11.3 mi)	1.0	tectonic	Has a 15 km (9 mi) high scarp on its SE margin
Io	Ionian Mons east ridge	12.7 km (7.9 mi) (approx.)	0.70	tectonic	Has the form of a curved double ridge
Io	Euboea Montes	10.5 to 13.4 km (6.5 to 8.3 mi)	0.74	tectonic	A NW flank landslide left a 25,000 km^{3} debris apron (Note: Among the Solar System's largest)
Io	unnamed (245° W, 30° S)	2.5 km (1.6 mi) (approx.)	0.14	volcanic	One of the tallest of Io's many volcanoes, with an atypical conical form (Note: Some of Io's paterae are surrounded by radial patterns of lava flows, indicating they are on a topographic high point, making them shield volcanoes. Most of these volcanoes exhibit relief of less than 1 km. A few have more relief; Ruwa Patera rises 2.5 to 3 km over its 300 km width. However, its slopes are only on the order of a degree. A handful of Io's smaller shield volcanoes have steeper, conical profiles; the example listed is 60 km across and has slopes averaging 4° and reaching 6-7° approaching the small summit depression.)
Mimas	Herschel central peak	7 km (4 mi) (approx.)	3.5	impact	See also: List of largest craters in the Solar System
Dione	Janiculum Dorsa	1.5 km (0.9 mi)	0.27	tectonic (Note: Was apparently formed via contraction.)	Surrounding crust depressed ca. 0.3 km.
Titan	Mithrim Montes	≤ 3.3 km (2.1 mi)	0.13	tectonic	May have formed due to global contraction
Titan	Doom Mons	1.45 km (0.90 mi)	0.056	cryovolcanic	Adjacent to Sotra Patera, a 1.7 km (1.1 mi) deep collapse feature
Iapetus	equatorial ridge	20 km (12 mi) (approx.)	2.7	uncertain (Note: Hypotheses of origin include crustal readjustment associated with a decrease in oblateness due to tidal locking, and deposition of deorbiting material from a former ring around the moon.)	Individual peaks have not been measured
Oberon	unnamed ("limb mountain")	11 km (7 mi) (approx.)	1.4	impact (?)	A value of 6 km was given shortly after the Voyager 2 encounter
Pluto	Tenzing Montes, peak "T2"	~6.2 km (3.9 mi)	0.52	tectonic (?)	Composed of water ice; named after Tenzing Norgay
Pluto	Piccard Mons	~5.5 km (3.4 mi)	0.46	cryovolcanic (?)	~220 km across; central depression is 11 km deep
Pluto	Wright Mons	~4.7 km (2.9 mi)	0.40	cryovolcanic (?)	~160 km across; summit depression ~56 km across and 4.5 km deep
Charon	Butler Mons	≥ 4.5 km (2.8 mi)	0.74	tectonic (?)	Vulcan Planitia, the southern plains, has several isolated peaks, possibly tilted crustal blocks
Charon	Dorothy central peak	~4.0 km (2.5 mi)	0.66	impact	North polar impact basin Dorothy, Charon's largest, is ~240 km across and 6 km deep
Máni	unnamed	25 km (16 mi)	6.3	impact	Discovered by stellar occultation; it is unclear whether this feature is a genuine topographic peak or a transiting/occulting satellite.

=== Tallest mountains by elevation ===
- Olympus Mons 72,000 ft (22,000 m)
- Equatorial Ridge 65,617 ft (20,000 m)
- Boösaule Mons 59,711 ft (18,200 m)
- Ascraeus Mons 49,000 ft (15,000 m)
- Ionian Mons 41,667 ft (12,700 m)
- Elysium Mons 41,338 ft (12,600 m)
- Arsia Mons 38,386 ft (11,700 m)
- Limb Mountain 36,089 ft (11,000 m)
- Maxwell Montes 35,105 ft (10,700 m)
- Euboea Montes 34,449 ft (10,500 m)
- Mauna Kea 33,500 ft (10,200 m)
- Mount Everest 29,029 ft (8,848 m)
- Herschel Peak 22,966 ft (7,000 m)
- Anseris Mons 20,341 ft (6,200 m)
- Tenzing Montes 20,341 ft (6,200 m)
- Denali/Mount McKinley 20,310 ft (6,190 m)
- Mount Kilimanjaro 19,341 ft (5,895 m)
- Mons Huygens 18,045 ft (5,500 m)
- Aeolis Mons 18,045 ft (5,500 m)
- Piccard Mons 18,045 ft (5,500 m)
- Maat Mons 16,076 ft (4,900 m)
- Wright Mons 15,420 ft (4,700 m)
- Mons Hadley 14,764 ft (4,500 m)
- Butler Mons 14,764 ft (4,500 m)
- Ahuna Mons 13,500 ft (4,100 m)
- Dorothy Peak 13,123 ft (4,000 m)
- Mithrim Montes 10,948 ft (3,337 m)
- Haleakalā 10,023 ft (3,055 m)
- Caloris Montes 9,843 ft (3,000 m)
- Io (unnamed peak) 8,202 ft (2,500 m)
- Janiculum Dorsa 4,921 ft (1,500 m)
- Doom Mons 4,757 ft (1,450 m)
- Mons Rümker 4,265 ft (1,300 m)

== Gallery ==
The following images are shown in order of decreasing base-to-peak height.

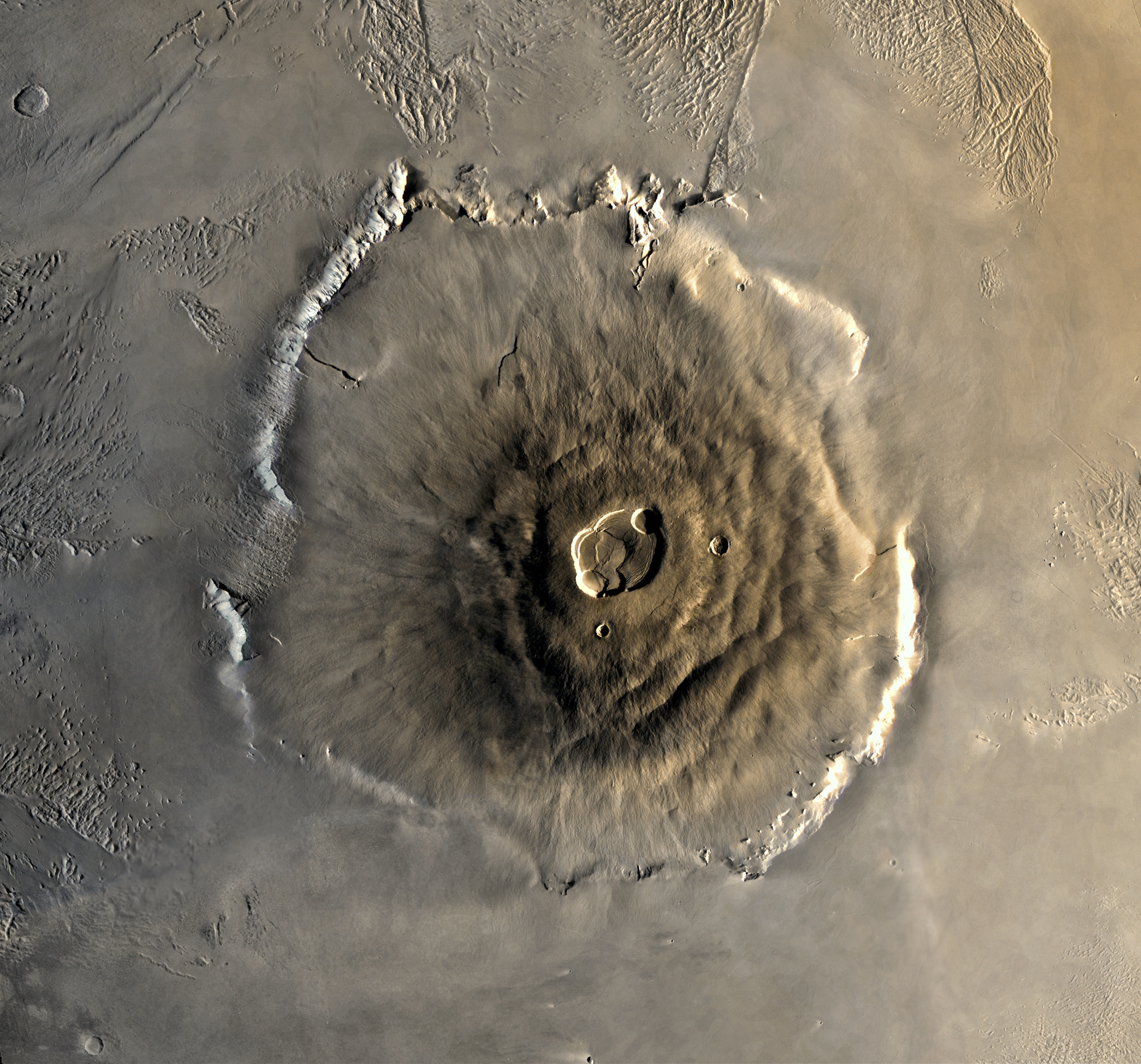
Olympus Mons on Mars as viewed from Viking 1 in 1978

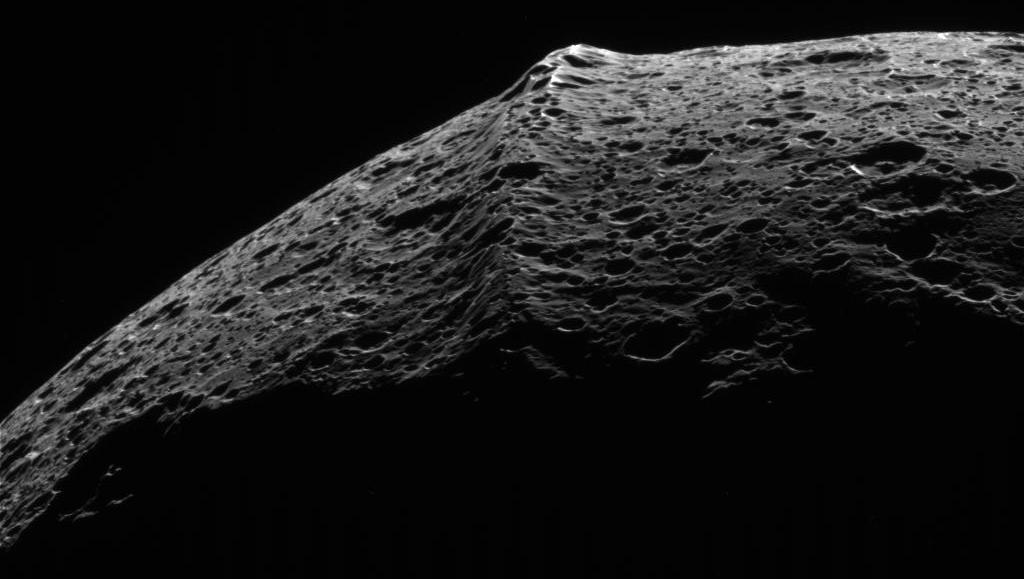
Cassini image of Iapetus's equatorial ridge

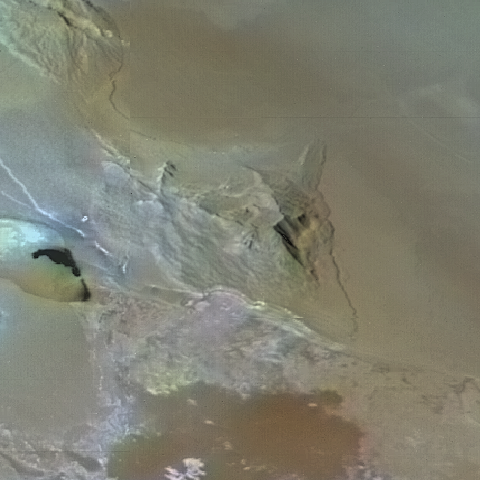
Voyager 1 photo of Io's highest peak, Boösaule Montes "South"

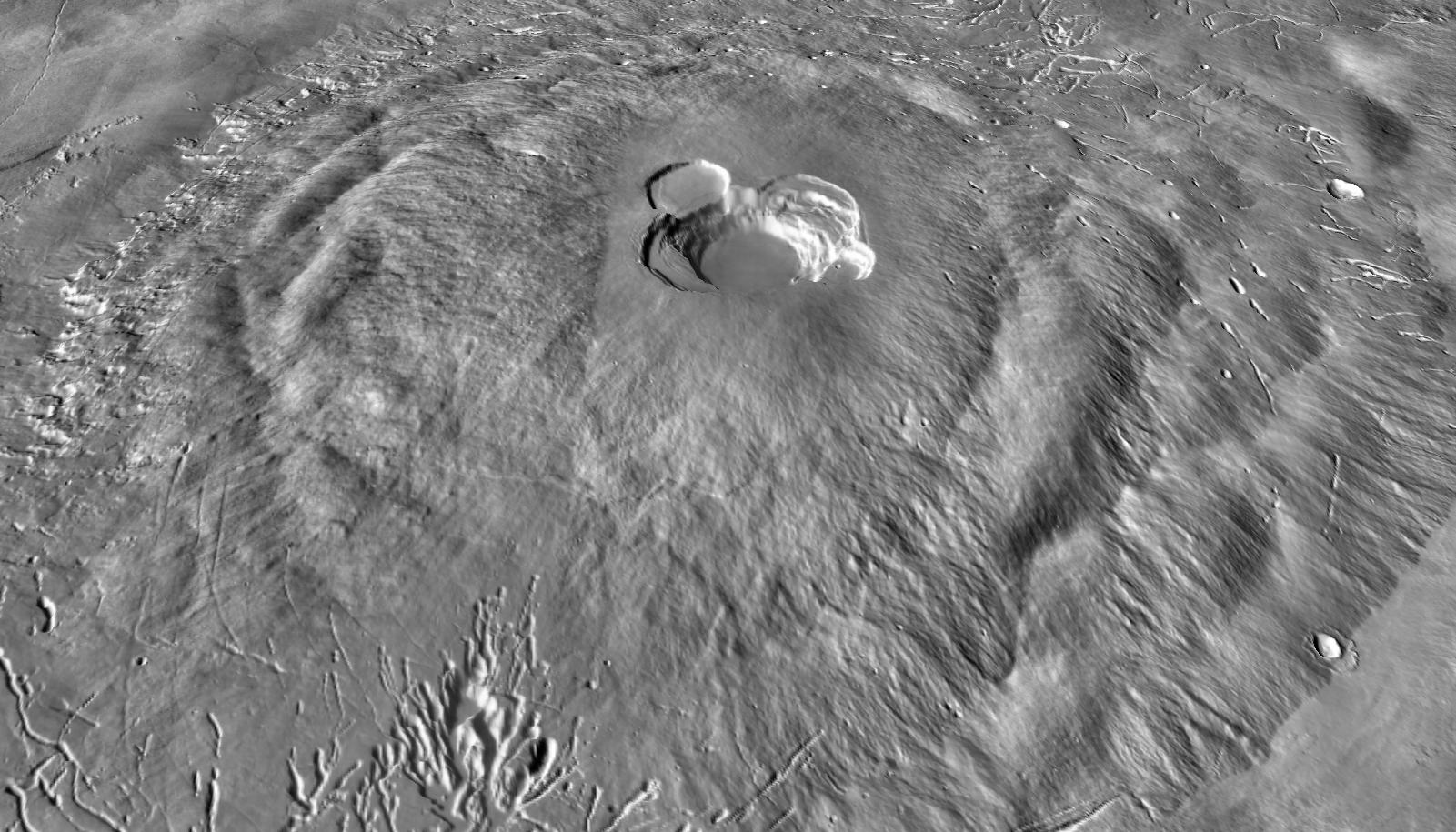
Ascraeus Mons (THEMIS IR with MOLA altimetry, 3x vertical stretch), Mars

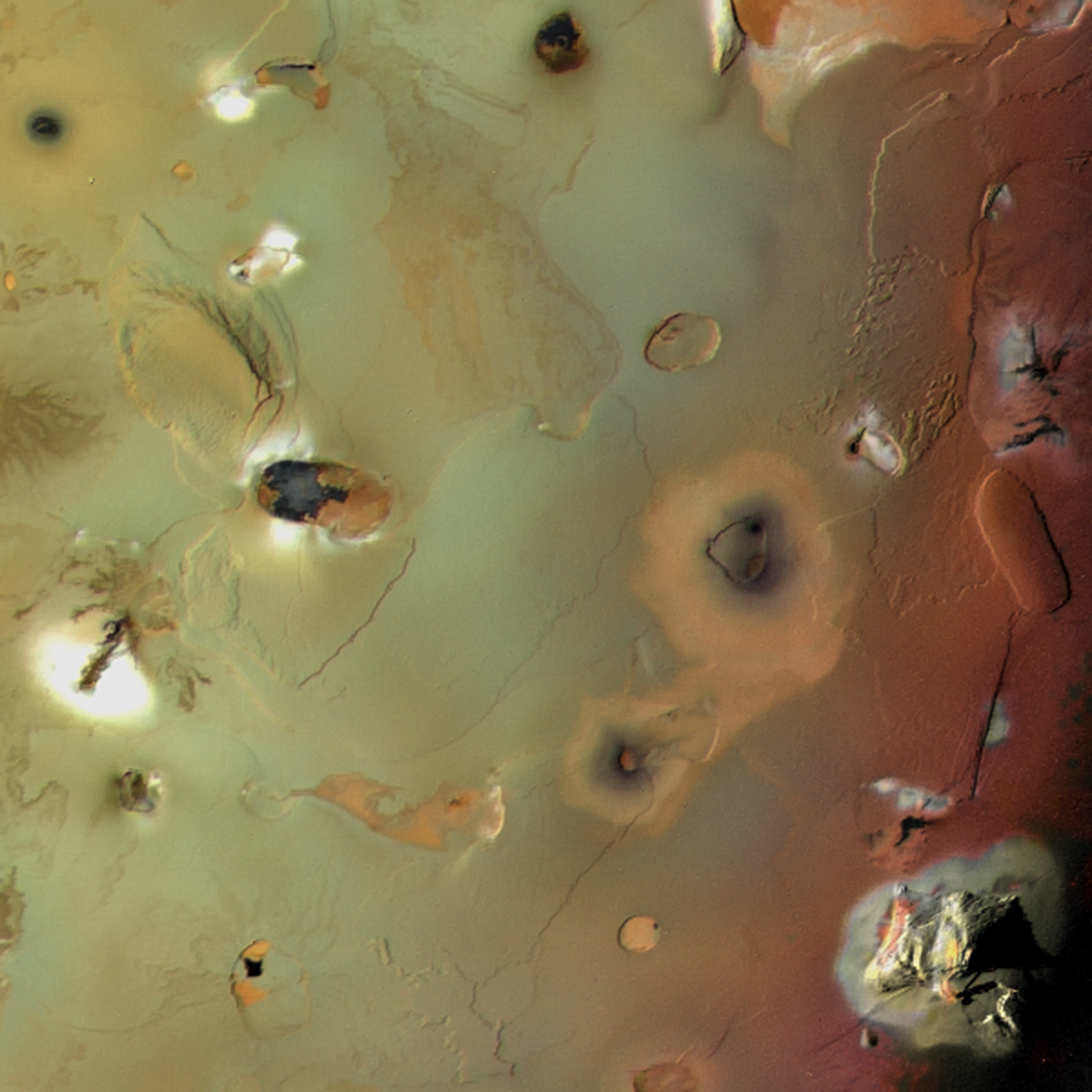
Io's Euboea Montes (below top left), Haemus Montes (lower right); north is left

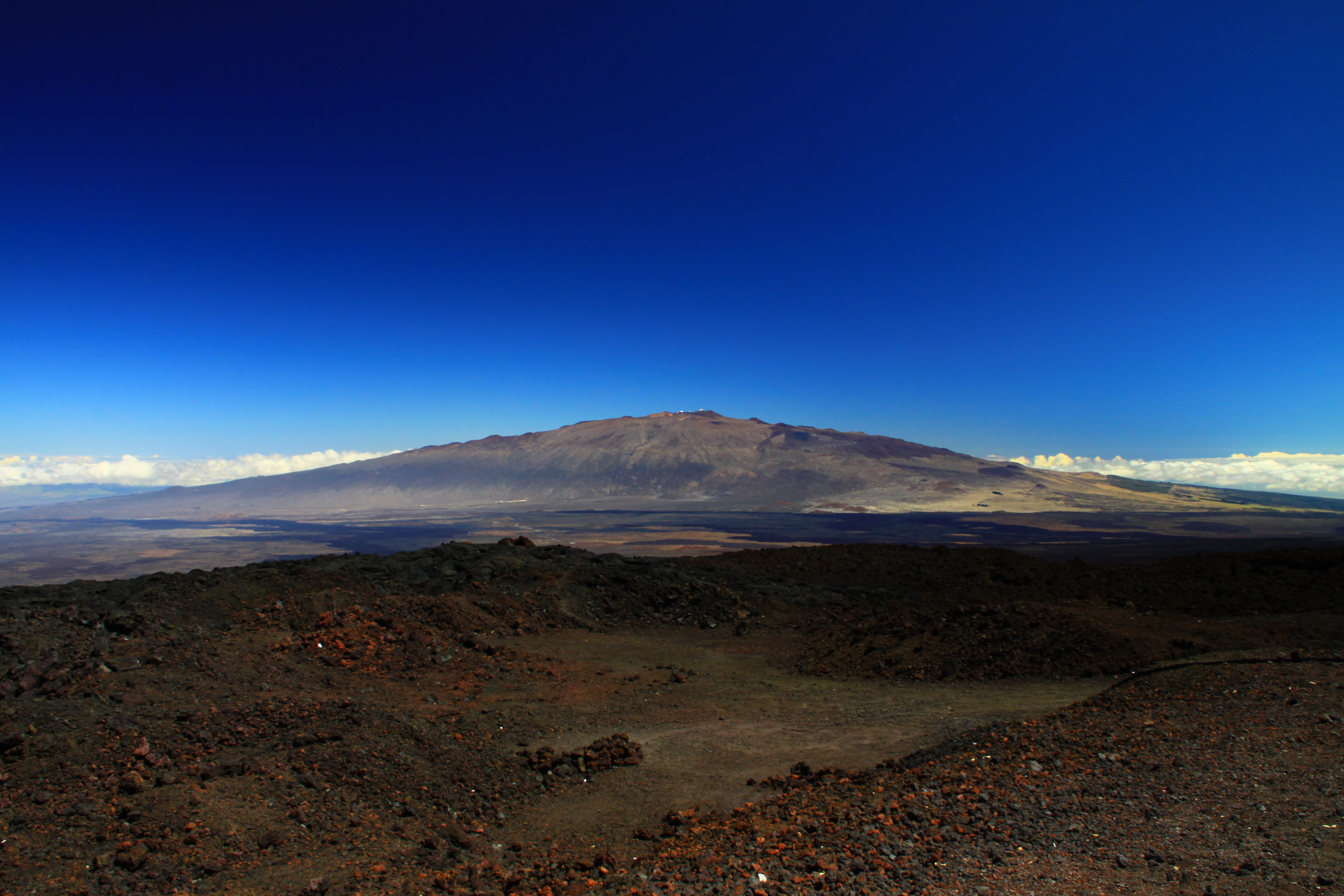
Mauna Kea (from Mauna Loa), Hawaii

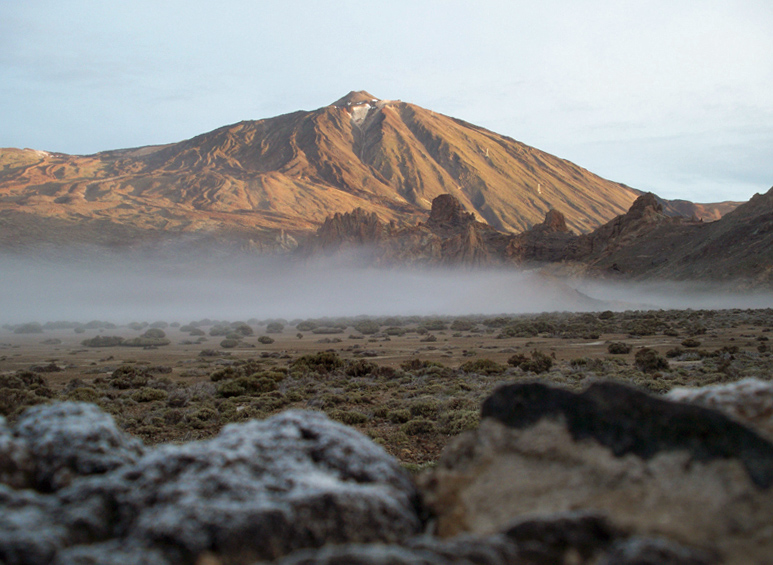
Teide, Canary Islands

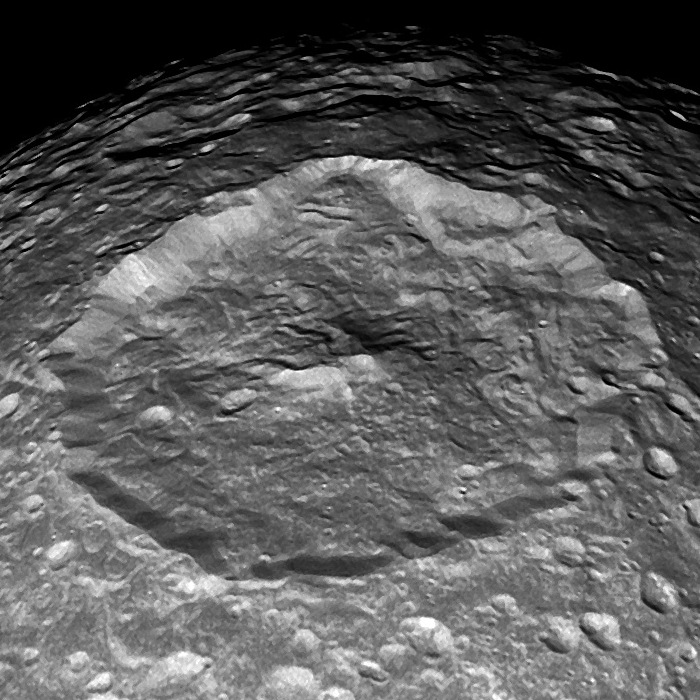
Cassini photo of Herschel crater on Mimas and its central peak

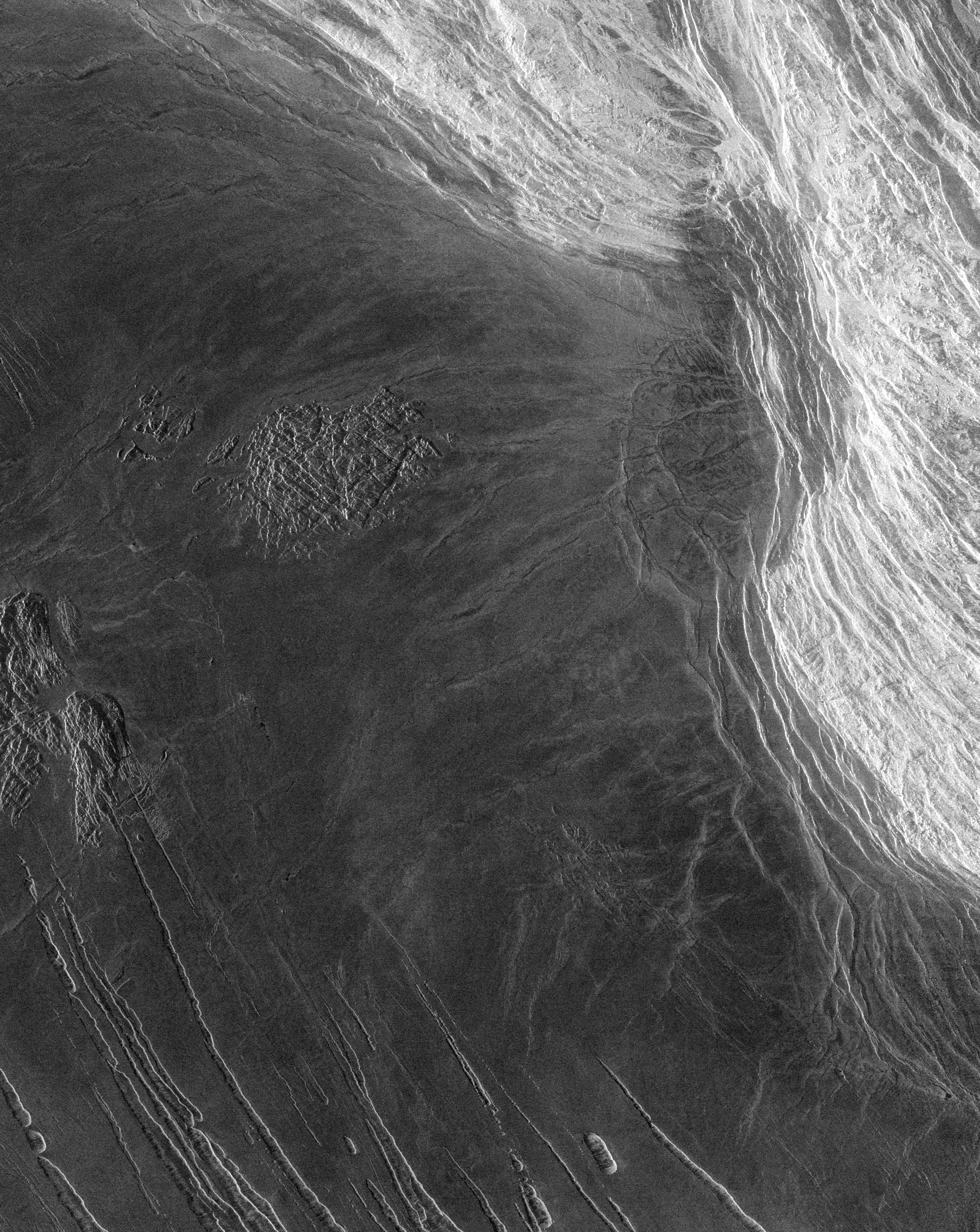
Magellan SAR image of Venus's Maxwell Montes

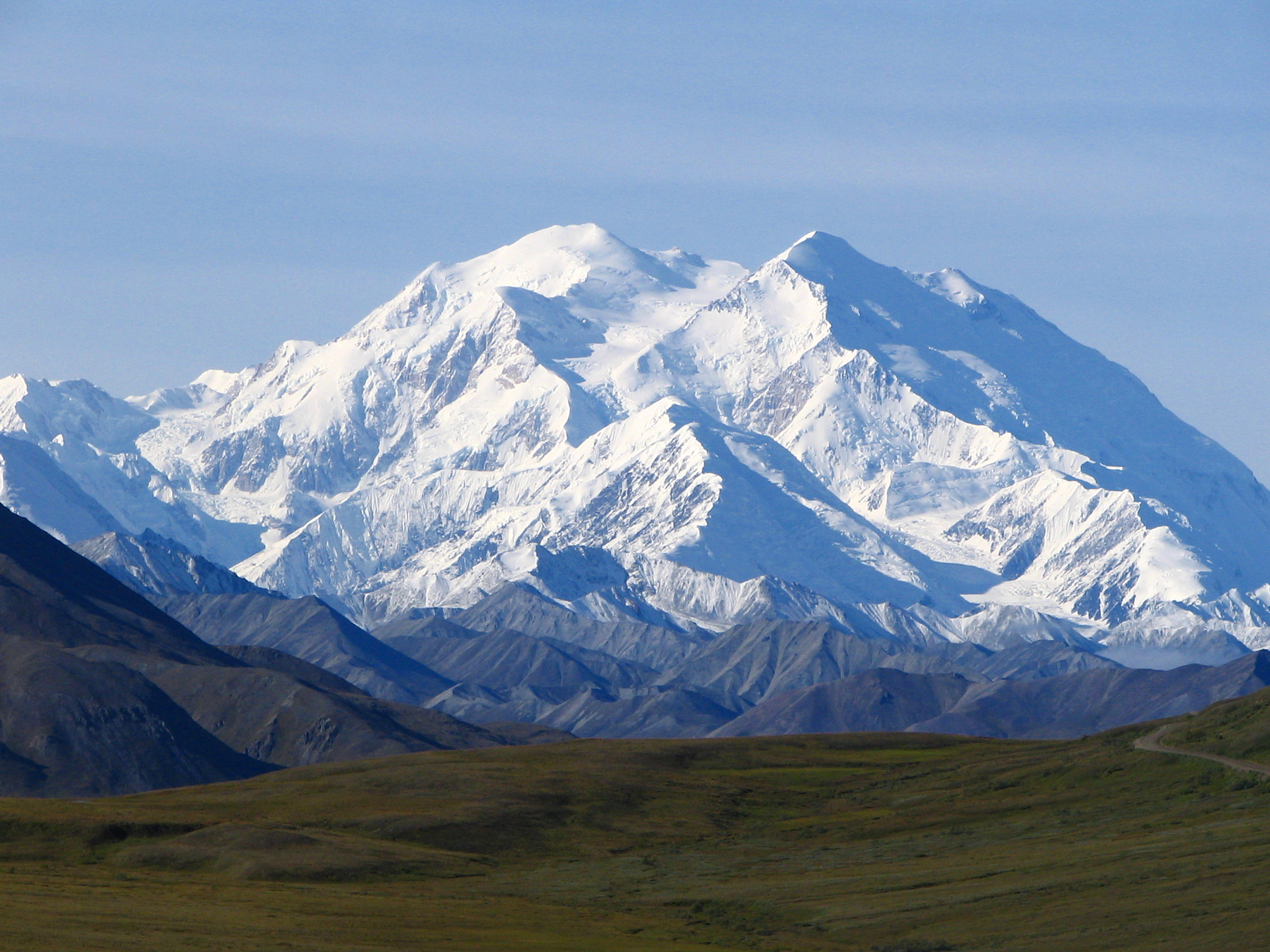
Denali (Mount McKinley), Alaska

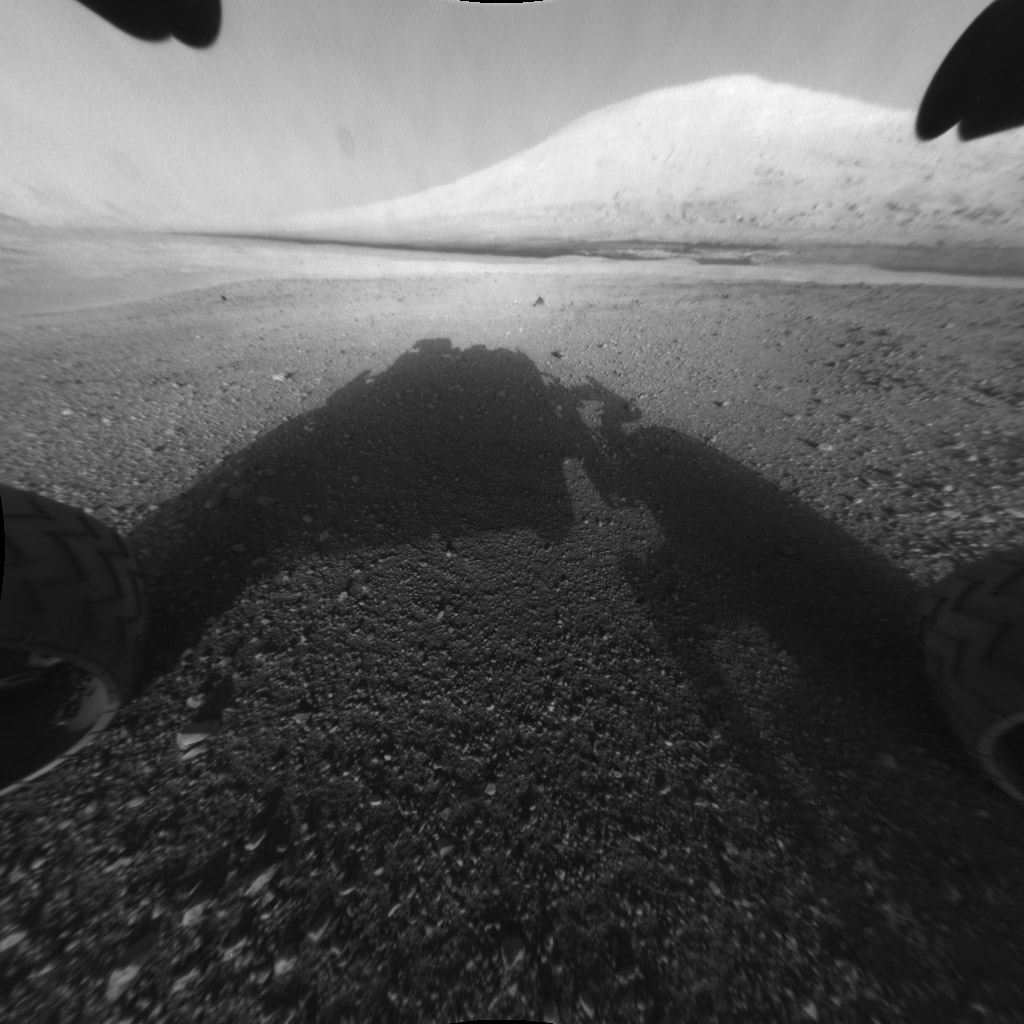
Aeolis Mons ("Mount Sharp"), Mars (as viewed by the rover Curiosity on 6 August 2012). (Note: A linearized wide-angle hazcam image that makes the mountain look steeper than it actually is. The highest peak is not visible in this view.)

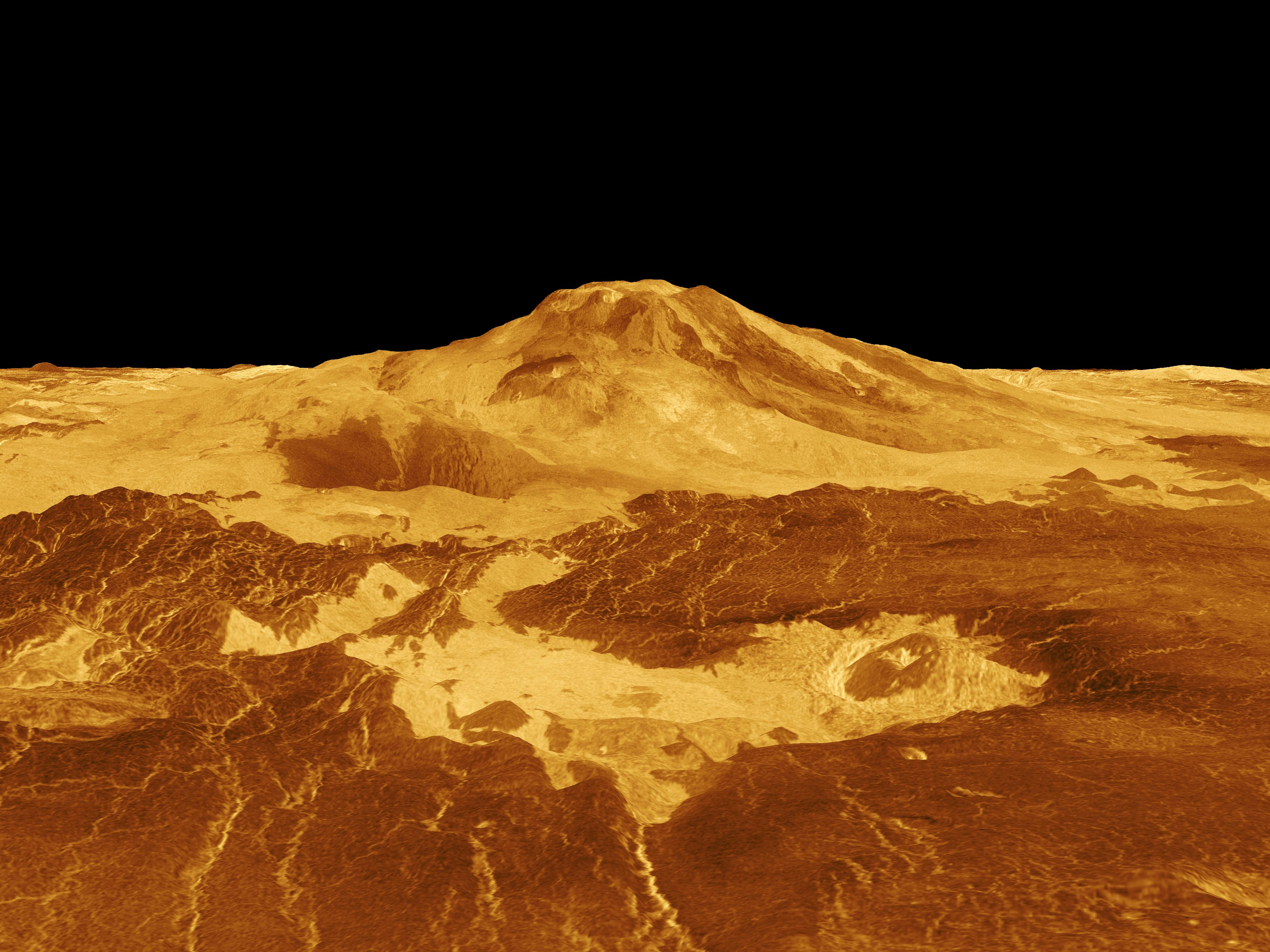
Maat Mons, Venus (radar imaging plus altimetry, 10x vertical exaggeration)

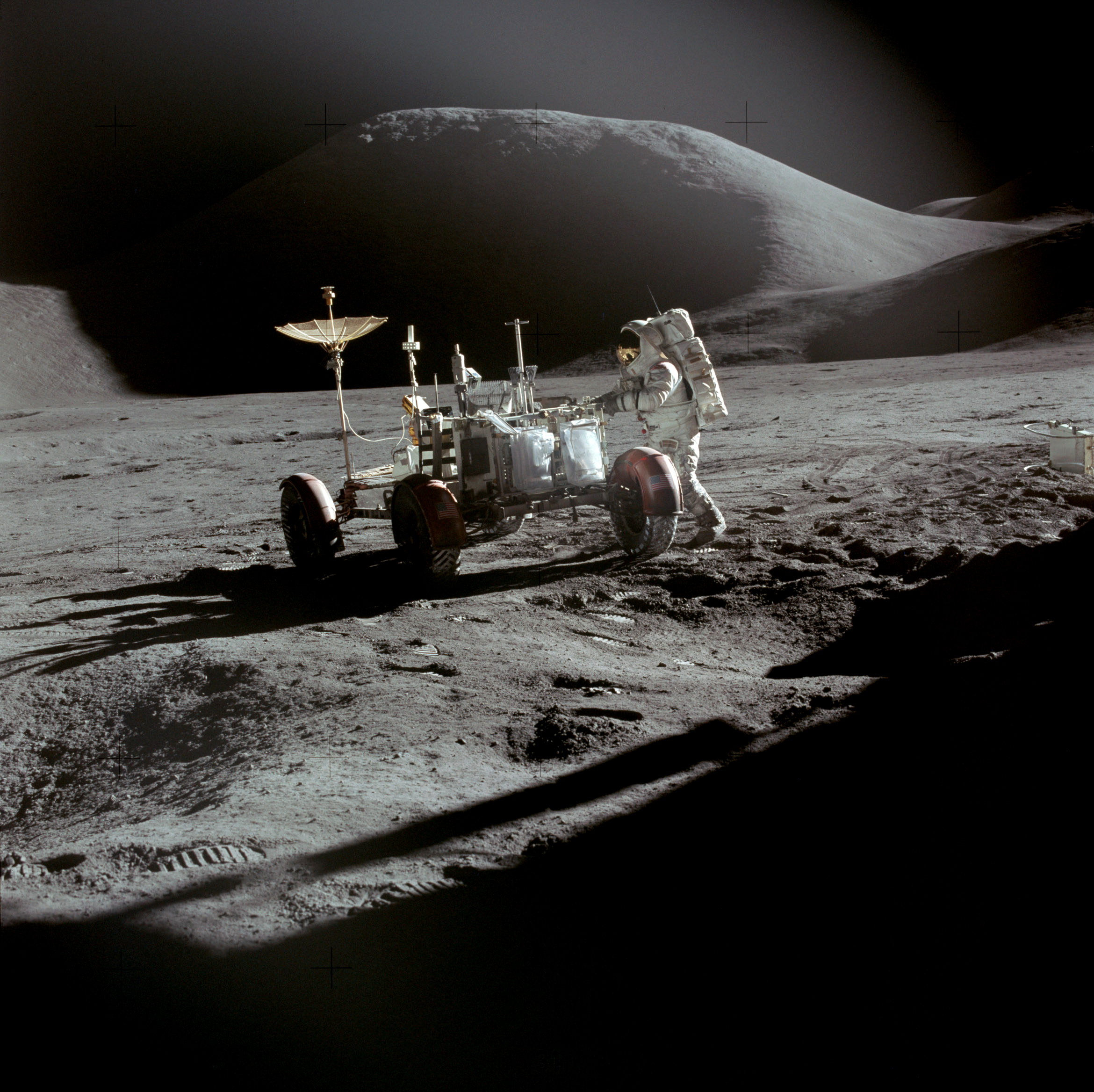
The Moon's Mons Hadley, near the Apollo 15 landing site (1971)

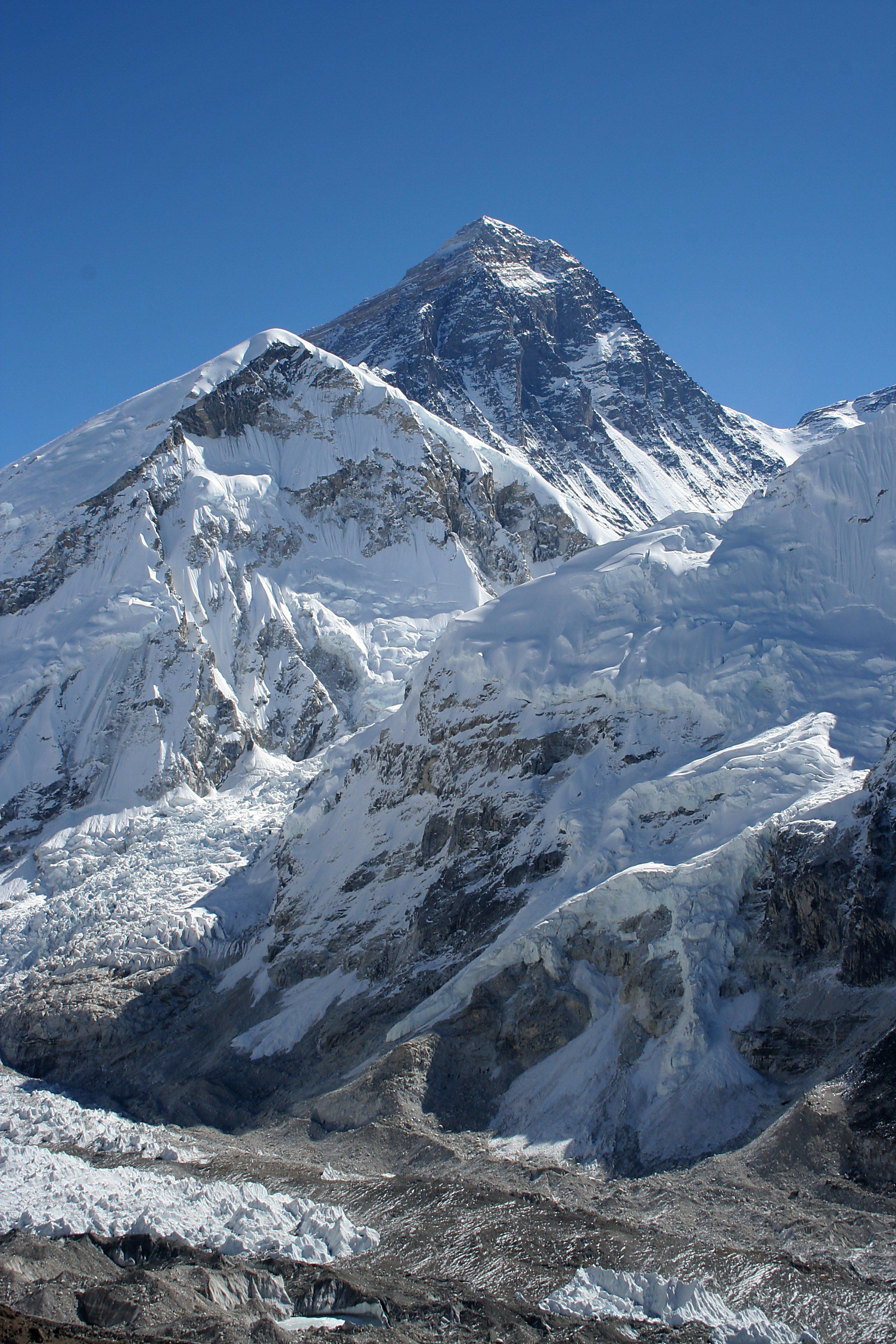
Mount Everest (Sagarmāthā/ Chomolungma), Nepal/Tibet

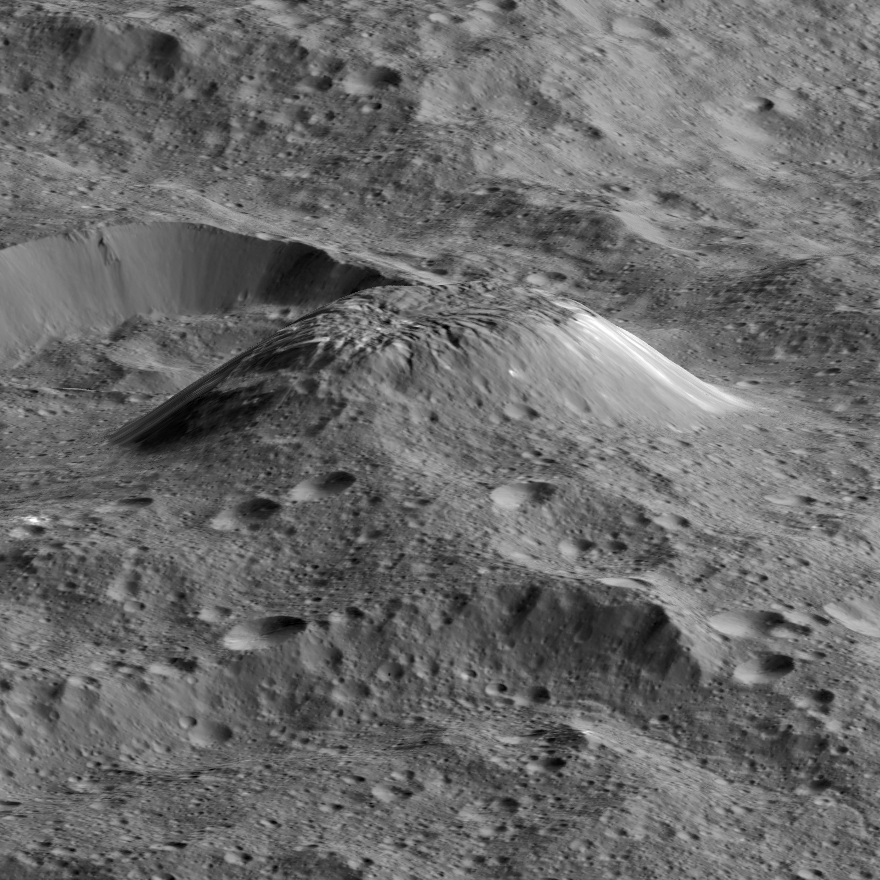
Ahuna Mons on Ceres, imaged by Dawn from LAMO

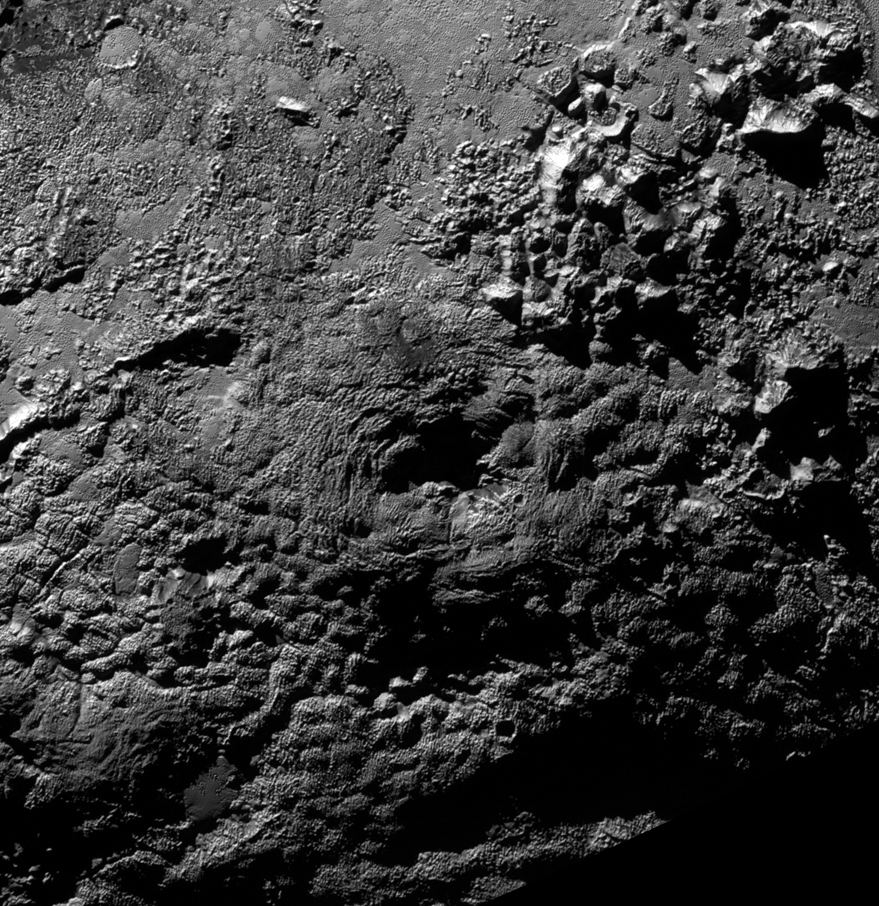
Pluto's possible cryovolcano Wright Mons, showing its central depression

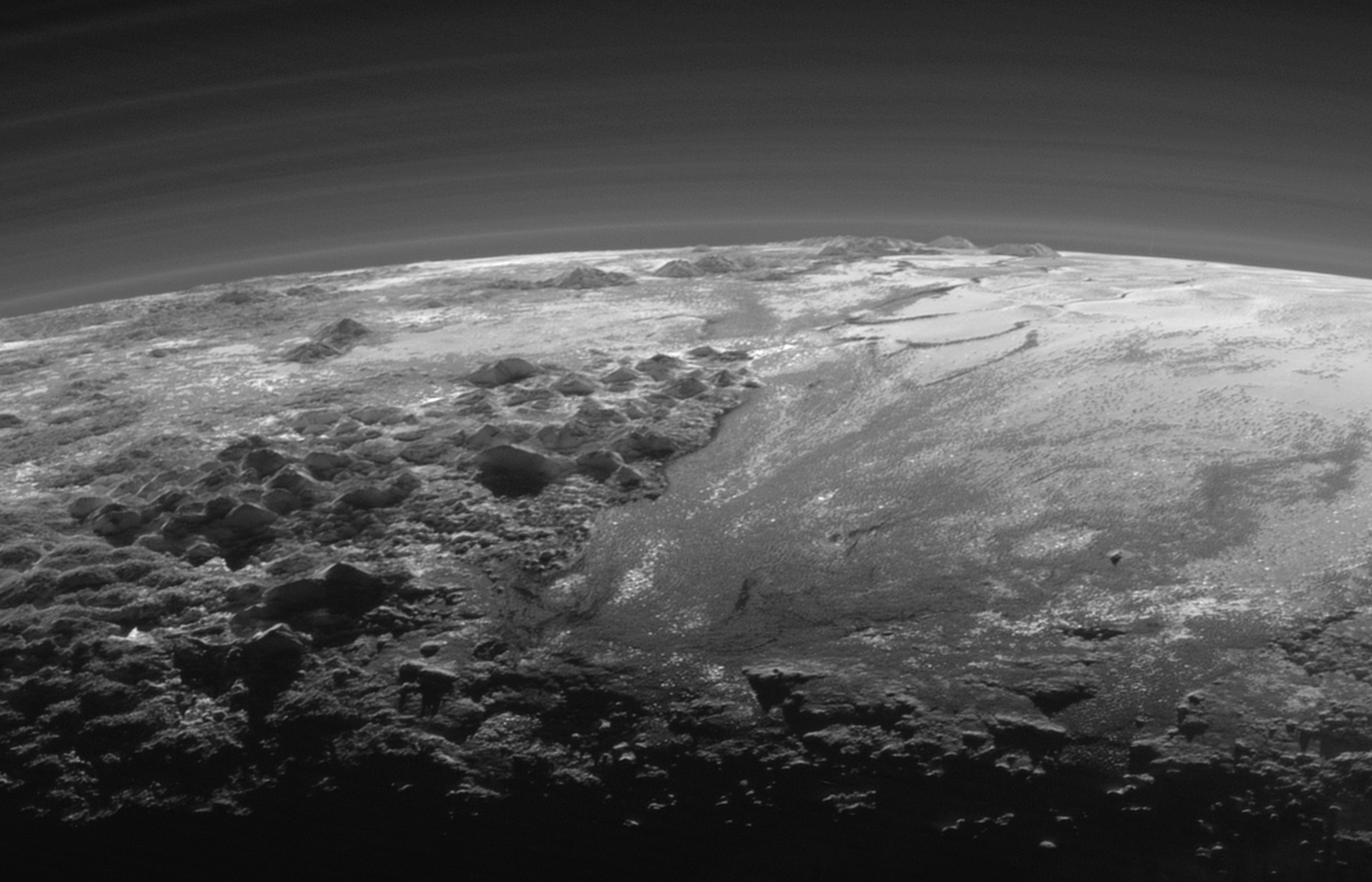
New Horizons view of Pluto's Tenzing Montes in the left foreground (also in preceding image) and Hillary Montes on the horizon

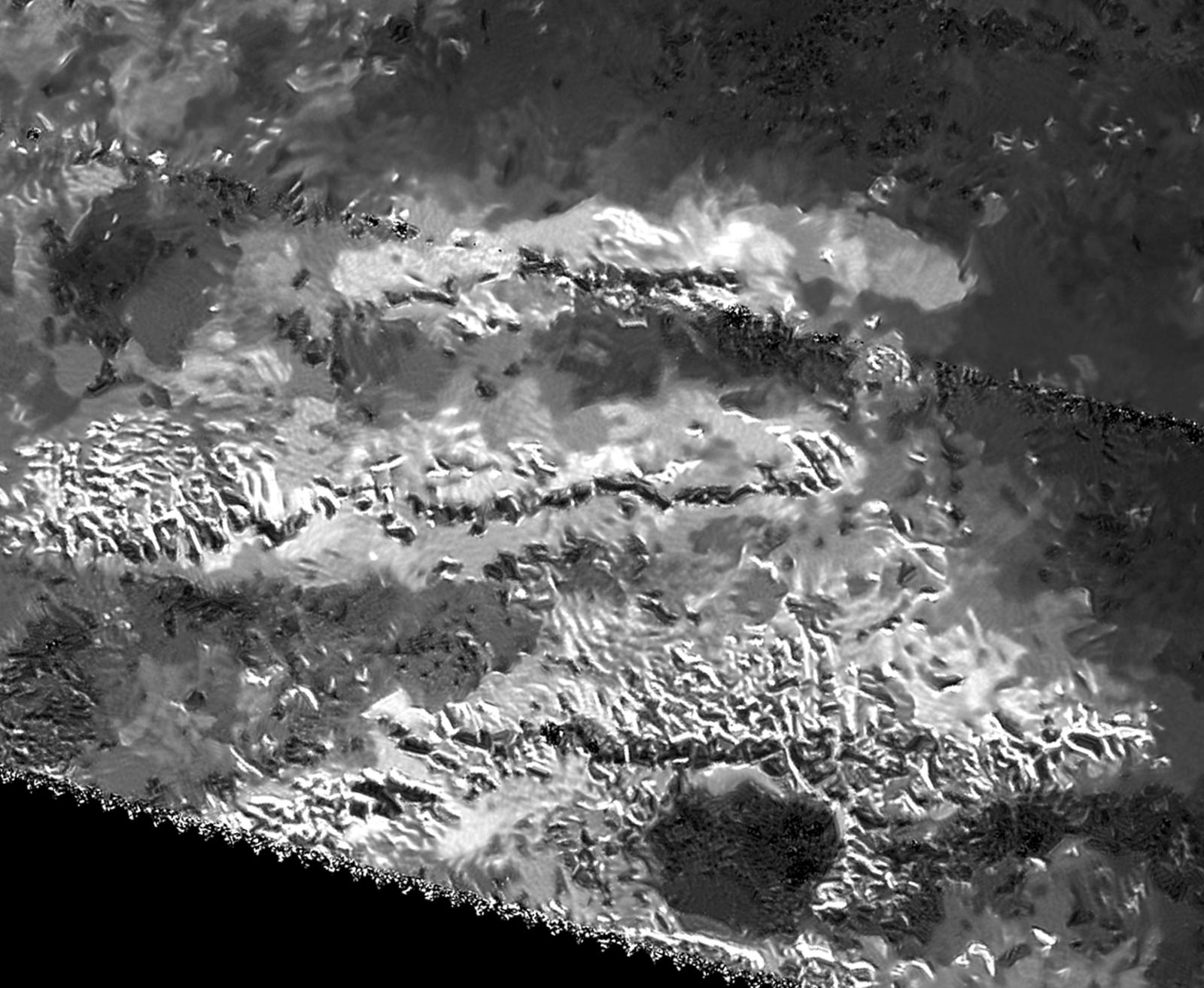
Cassini SAR image of Titan's Mithrim Montes, showing three parallel ridges

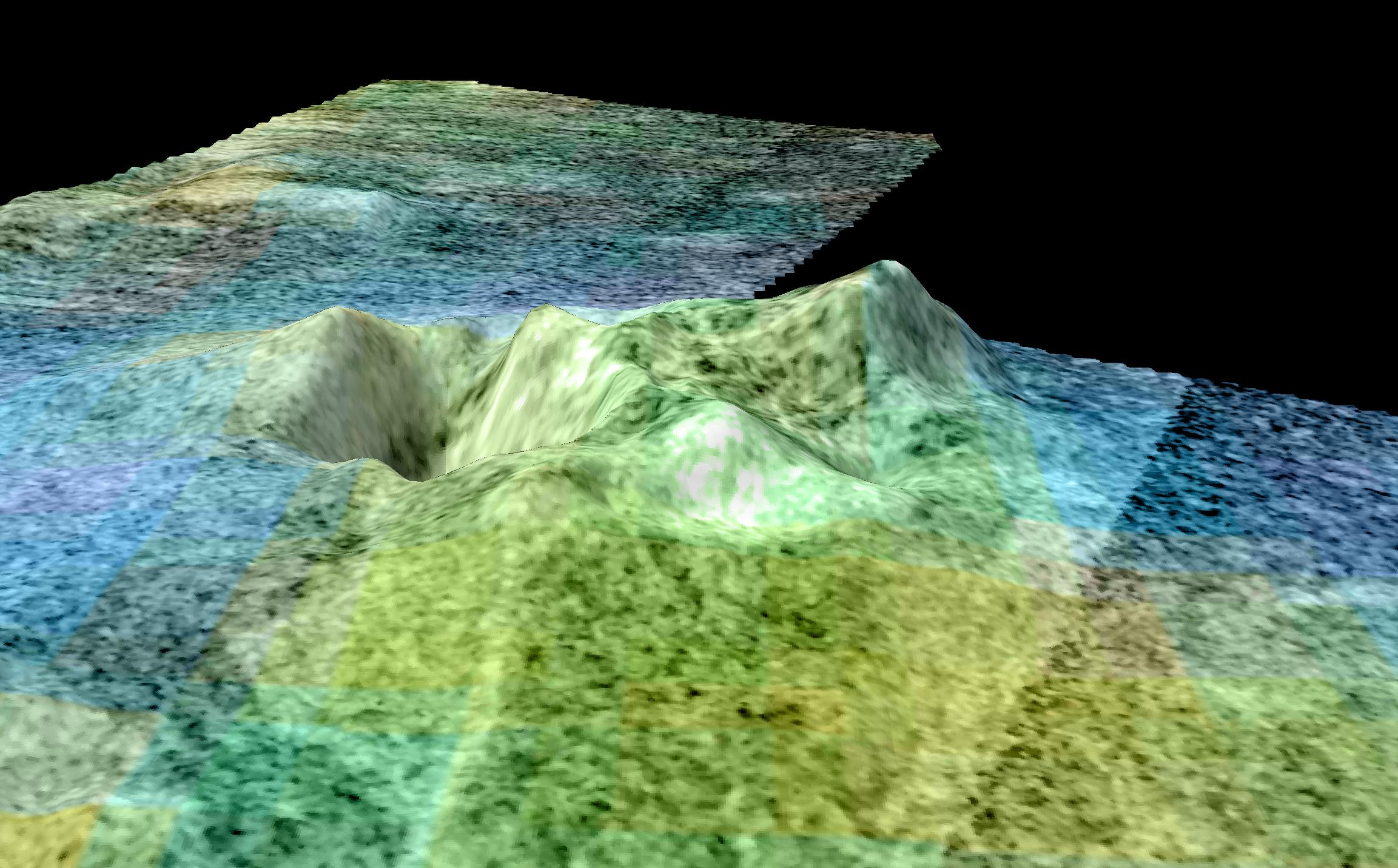
Radar-generated view of Titan's cryovolcanic Doom Mons and Sotra Patera (10x vertical stretch)

== See also ==
- List of extraterrestrial volcanoes
- List of highest mountains on Earth
- List of Solar System extremes
  - List of largest craters in the Solar System
  - List of largest lakes and seas in the Solar System
  - List of largest rifts, canyons and valleys in the Solar System
- List of mountains on Mars
- Mons (planetary nomenclature)
- Topographic prominence
