= Euboea (disambiguation) =

Euboea is the second-largest island in Greece. The word may also refer to:

- Euboea (constituency), electoral district in Greece
- Euboea (regional unit), an administrative division which includes the island
- Euboea (mythology), the name of several women in Greek myths
- 1119 Euboea, an asteroid, named after the island
- Euboea Montes, a volcano on the moon Io, also named after the island
