= Dorothee (given name) =

Dorothee or Dorothée is a German or French (respectively) female given name, a variant of Dorothy. Notable people with this name include:

- Dorothée (born 1953), French singer
- Dorothee Bär (born 1978), German politician
- Dorothee Bauer (born 1983), German Olympic sport shooter
- Dorothée Berryman (born 1948), Canadian actress
- Dorothee Bohle (born 1964), German political scientist
- Dorothée de Courlande or Dorothée de Dino (1793–1862), German princess
- Dorothée Dupuis (born 1980), French art curator, critic, and publisher
- Dorothee Elmiger (born 1985), Swiss writer
- Dorothée Gilbert (born 1983), French ballerina
- Dorothee Haroske (born 1968), German mathematician
- Dorothée Jemma (born 1956), French voice actress
- Dorothée Laternser (born 1951), German-born Liechtenstein paediatrician and politician
- Dorothée Le Maître (1896–1990), French paleontologist
- Dorothée Lima (male), Dahomean newspaper editor and publisher
- Dorothee Kern (born 1966), German-American basketball player and biochemist
- Dorothee Metlitzki (1914–2001), German-American author and English professor
- Dorothee Mields (born 1971), German singer
- Dorothée de Monfreid (born 1973), French author and illustrator
- Dorothée Munyaneza (born 1982), British-Rwandan singer, actress, dancer and choreographer
- Dorothee Oberlinger (born 1969), German musician and professor
- Dorothee Pesch (born 1969, aka Doro), German singer-songwriter
- Dorothée Pullinger (1894–1986), French-English automobile engineer
- Dorothee Rätsch (born 1940), German sculptor
- Dorothee Schneider (born 1969), German dressage rider
- Dorothée Smith (aka SMITH), French artist
- Dorothee Sölle (1929–2003, aka Dorothee Steffensky-Sölle, Dorothee Nipperdey), German liberation theologian
- Dorothee Stapelfeldt (born 1956), German politician
- Dorothée de Talleyrand-Périgord (1862–1948), French aristocrat
- Dorothee Elisabeth Tretschlaff (1686–1701), German women executed for witchcraft
- Dorothee Vieth (born 1960), German Paralympic cyclist
- Dorothee Wenner, German film curator and journalist
- Dorothee Wilms (born 1929), German politician

== See also ==
- Dorothee Island, an island in Australia
- Jean-Félix Dorothée, French footballer
