= Anseris Mons =

Martian mountain

- Feature type: Mountain
- Coordinates: 29.81°S 86.65°E

Anseris Mons /ˈænsərɪs ˈmɒnz/ is an isolated massif (mountain) in the southern highlands of Mars, located at the northeastern edge of Hellas Planitia at longitude 86.65°E and latitude 29.81°S. The mountain is 58 km (36 mi) in diameter and rises to an elevation of approximately 4,200 m (13,780 ft) above datum (martian "sea" level) or about 6,200 m (20,300 ft) above the surrounding plains. The mountain lies in the southeastern quarter of the Iapygia quadrangle (MC-21), straddling the boundary with the adjoining Hellas quadrangle (MC-28) to the south.

Anseris Mons is named from Anseris Fons, a telescopic albedo feature mapped by Greek astronomer E. M. Antoniadi in 1930. The name was approved by the International Astronomical Union (IAU) in 1991.

Anseris Mons is not a volcano. Geologically, the massif is thought to be the eroded remnant of an ancient crustal block uplifted from depths of several kilometers in the formation of the Hellas impact basin during the period of heavy bombardment. Anseris Mons is the type area for a large set of rugged mountain blocks (>25 km across) that occur in a relatively continuous band 200 to 500 km wide around the western, northeastern, eastern, and southeastern rim of the Hellas basin. Many of the blocks, particularly along the western rim, are concentric with the basin and bounded by faults.

Rocks making up Anseris Mons and other massifs around Hellas are mapped as Noachian in age. However, work by Herbert Frey at NASA’s Goddard Spaceflight Center using Mars Orbital Laser Altimeter (MOLA) data indicates that the southern highlands of Mars contain numerous buried impact basins that are older than the visible Noachian-aged surfaces and which pre-date the Hellas impact. He suggests that the Hellas impact should mark the beginning of the Noachian period (base of the Noachian system). If Frey is correct, then Anseris Mons bedrock is actually pre-Noachian in age, perhaps dating back to over 4.1 billion years ago.

The Anseris Mons massif has undergone a significant amount of erosion since it was uplifted. The flanks of the mountain have huge triangular re-entrants and associated spurs, which give the massif a broad, pyramidal shape. The re-entrants were likely produced through a variety of mass-wasting and periglacial/glacial processes. A large cirque-like re-entrant with channelized debris aprons or fans is present on the south side of the mountain.

== Images ==
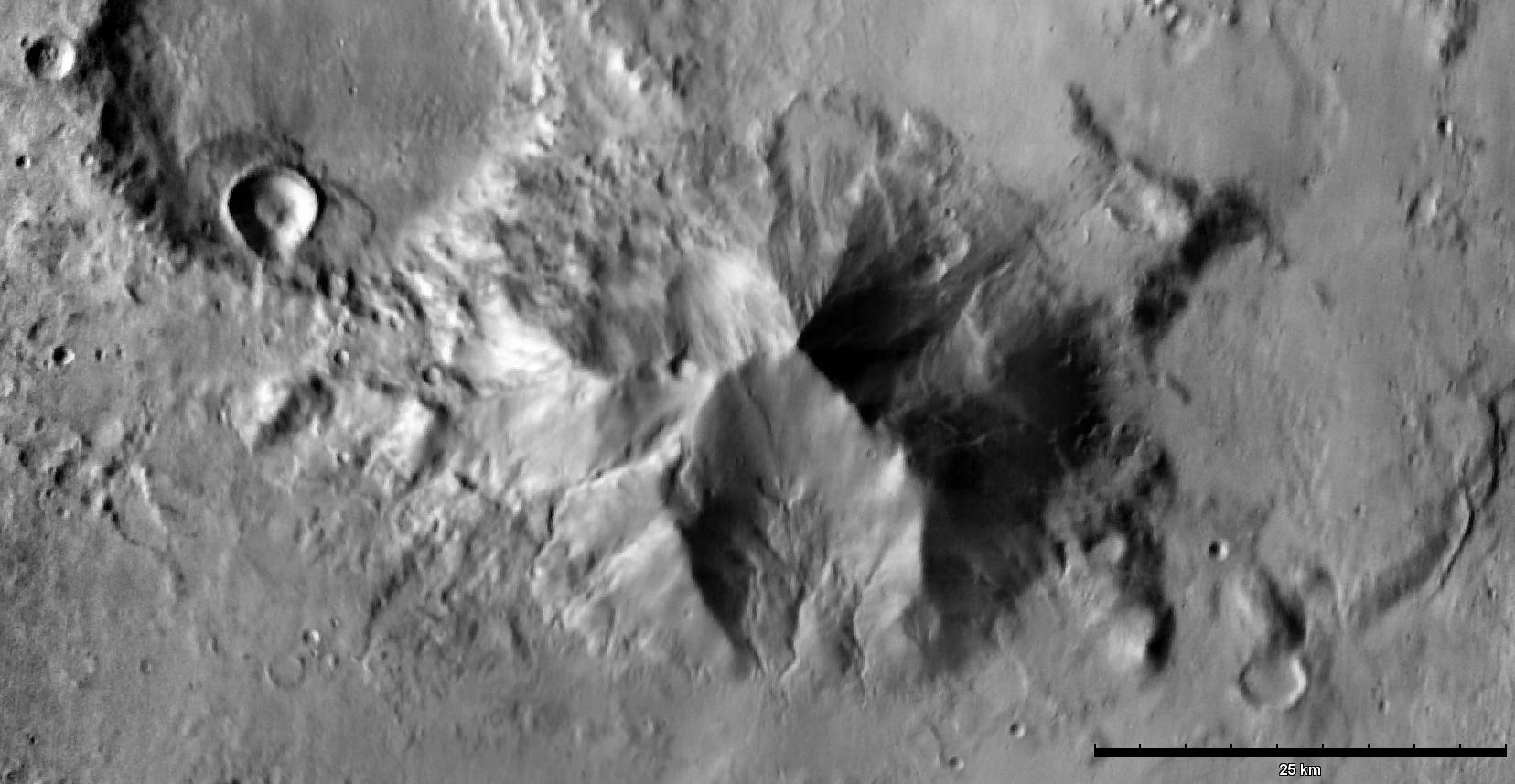
Anseris Mons

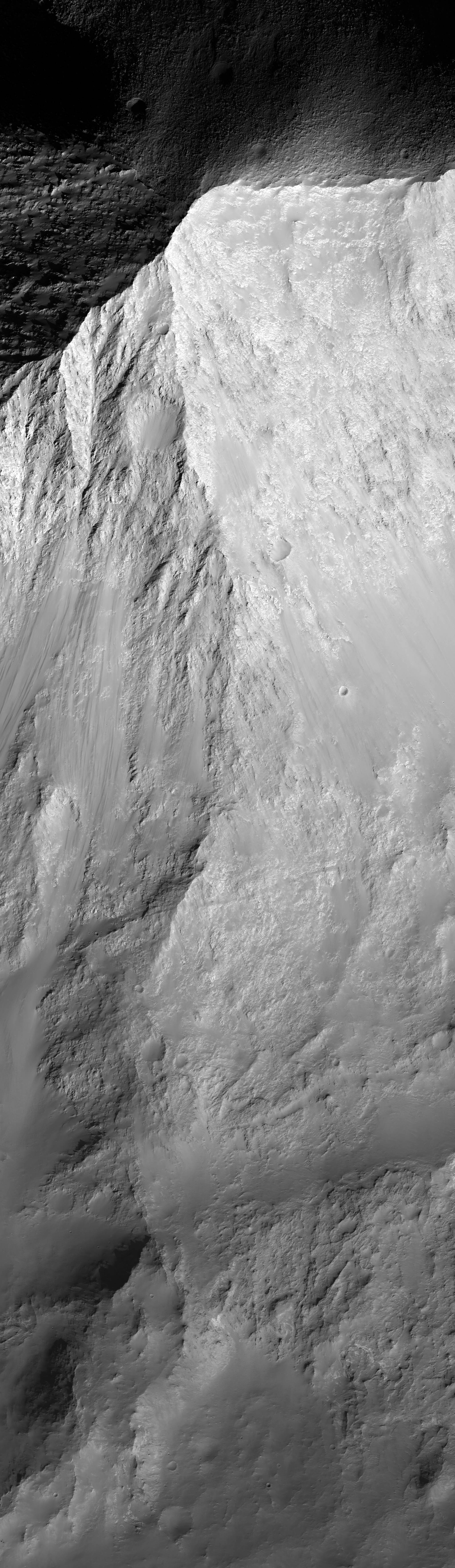
Northern face of Anseris Mons showing areas of exposed bedrock.

== See also ==
- List of mountains on Mars
- List of mountains on Mars by height
- List of tallest mountains in the Solar System
