= Selenean summit =

Highest point on the Moon

Selenean summit refers to the highest point on the Moon, notionally similar to Mount Everest on the Earth.

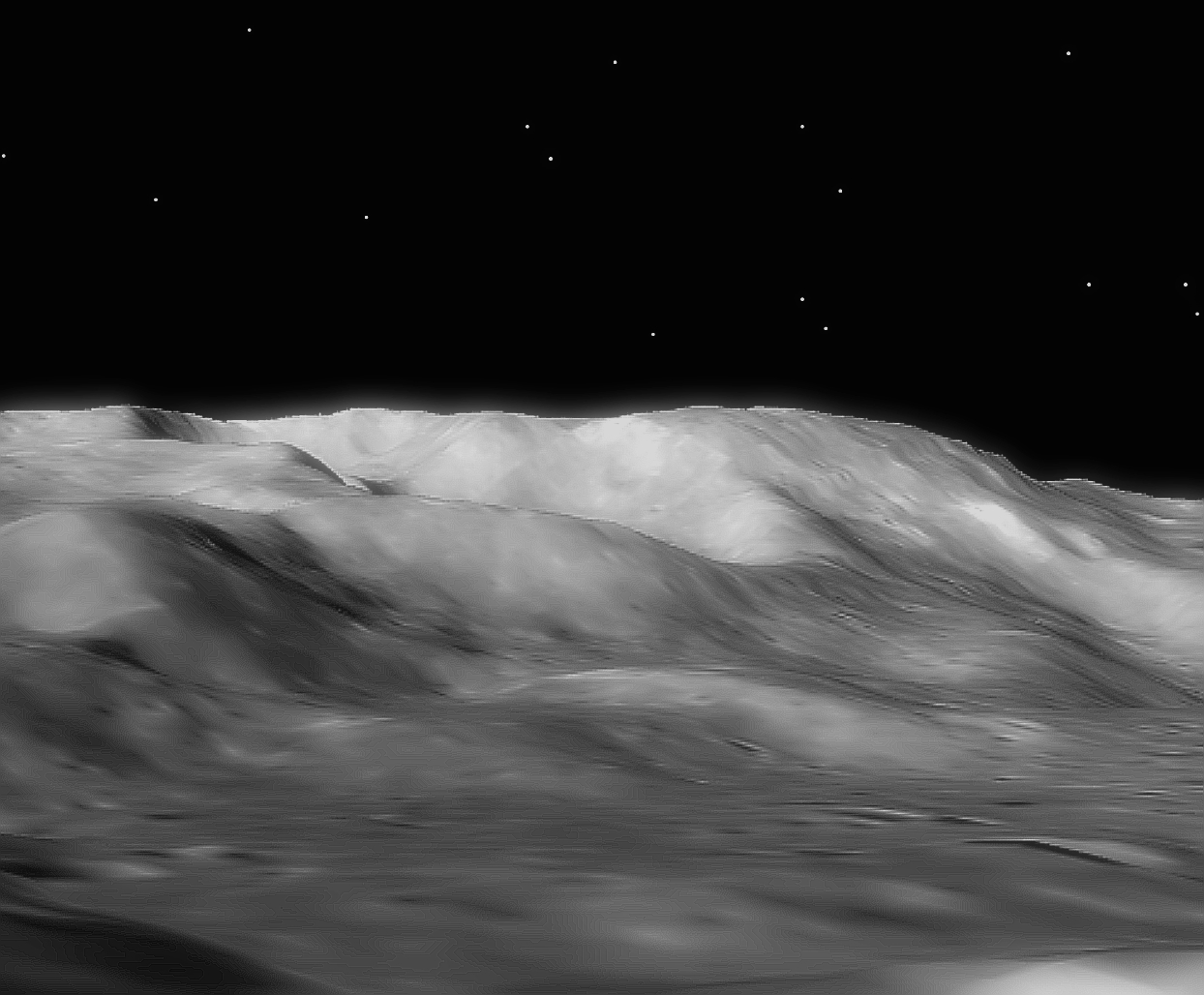
Artist view approaching the Selenian Summit heading SW, looking towards Engel'gardt crater.

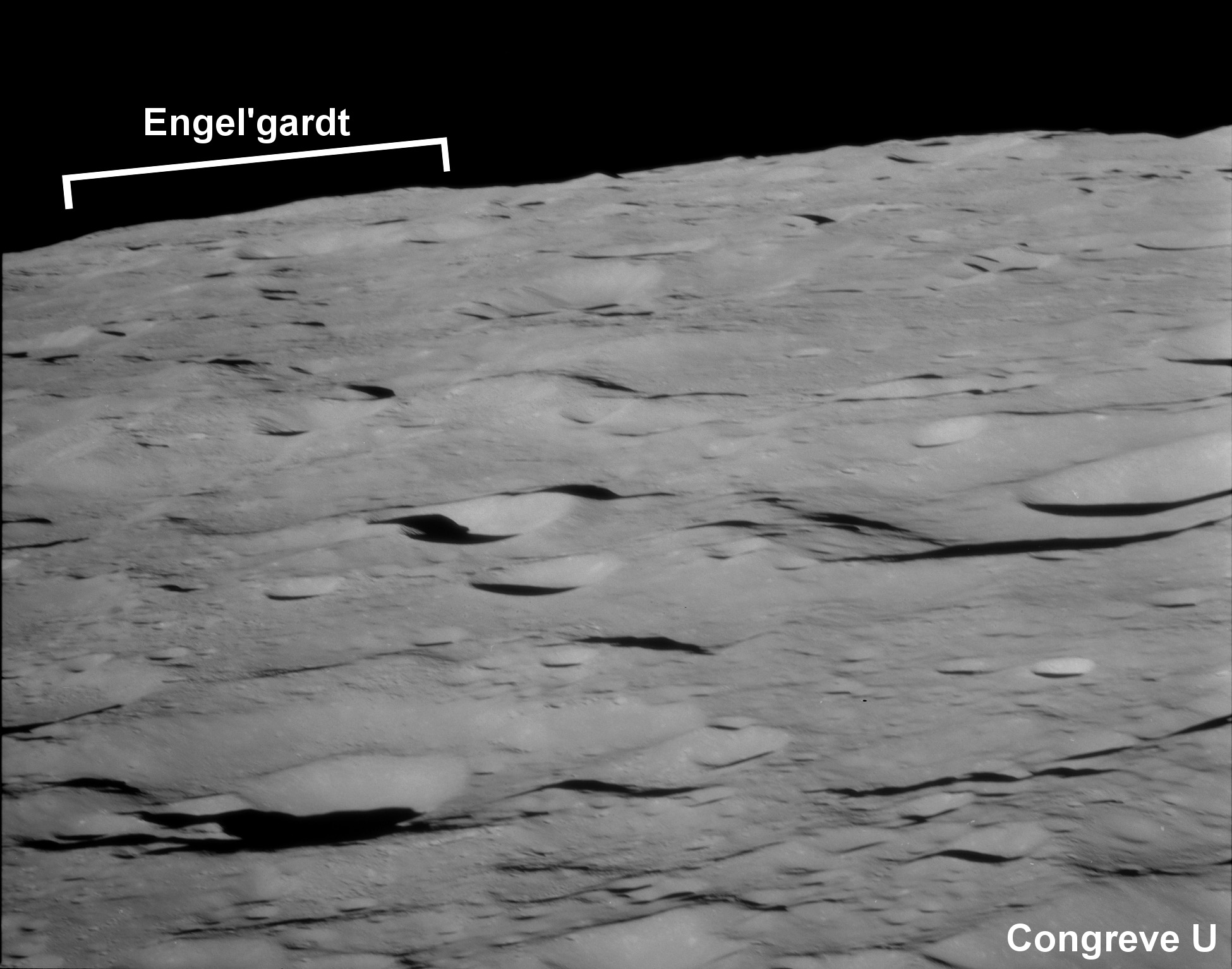
Annotated photograph from Apollo 11 facing east towards the rim of Engel'gardt, showing the summit in profile.

At some 10,786 m (35,387 ft) above the lunar mean, it is nearly twenty percent "taller" than Earth's relative highest point, Everest. The summit is located along the north-eastern rim of Engel'gardt crater. Although methods of measurement differ somewhat (e.g., the Moon lacks a sea level), since its discovery in 2010 by the LRO teams, nowhere else has surpassed this region's height measurements on the lunar surface. Approximate coordinates for the summit are 5.4125°N 158.6335°W. Later measurements put the summit at 5.441°N 158.656°W and 10.629 kilometres (6.605 mi).

The summit is located on the far side of the Moon relative to Earth.

== See also ==
- List of tallest mountains in the Solar System
- Mons Huygens
- Antoniadi (lunar crater), lowest point at −9.178 kilometres (−5.703 mi)
