= Boösaule =

Cave in Greek mythology

In Greek mythology, Boösaule /ˌboʊ.ɒˈsɔːliː/ (Greek Βοὸς αὐλή Boos aylē 'Cow pen') is a cave in Euboea where, according to Strabo, Io gave birth to Epaphus.

== See also ==
- List of Greek deities
- Boösaule Montes:mountain of Jupiter's moon Io
