= Mons Huygens =

Highest mountain in the Moon's Montes Apenninus range

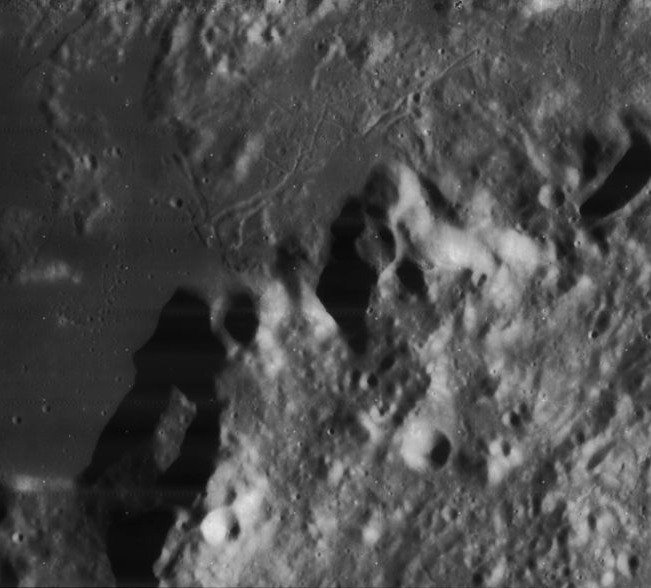
- Lunar Orbiter 4 image of Mons Ampère (below left of center) and Mons Huygens (above right of center)

Highest point
- Elevation: 5.3 km (3.3 mi) 17,380 ft (5,300 m)
- Listing: Lunar mountains
- Coordinates: 19°31′33″N 2°54′14″W

Naming
- English translation: Mount Huygens
- Language of name: Latin

Geography
- Location: the Moon

Mons Huygens is the highest mountain in the Moon's Montes Apenninus range. Adjacent to the west is Mons Ampère. The Montes Apenninus were formed by the impact that created Mare Imbrium. Mons Huygens rises 5,300 m (17,380 ft) from its Mare Imbrium base, per altimetry data from the Lunar Reconnaissance Orbiter. The mountain was named after the Dutch astronomer, mathematician and physician Christiaan Huygens. He is known for discovering Saturn's largest moon, Titan.

Mons Huygens has often been mistakenly cited as the Moon's tallest mountain and compared with Mount Everest, giving the incorrect impression that the Moon's tallest mountain is only a little more than half the height of Earth's tallest above sea level.

== Surroundings ==
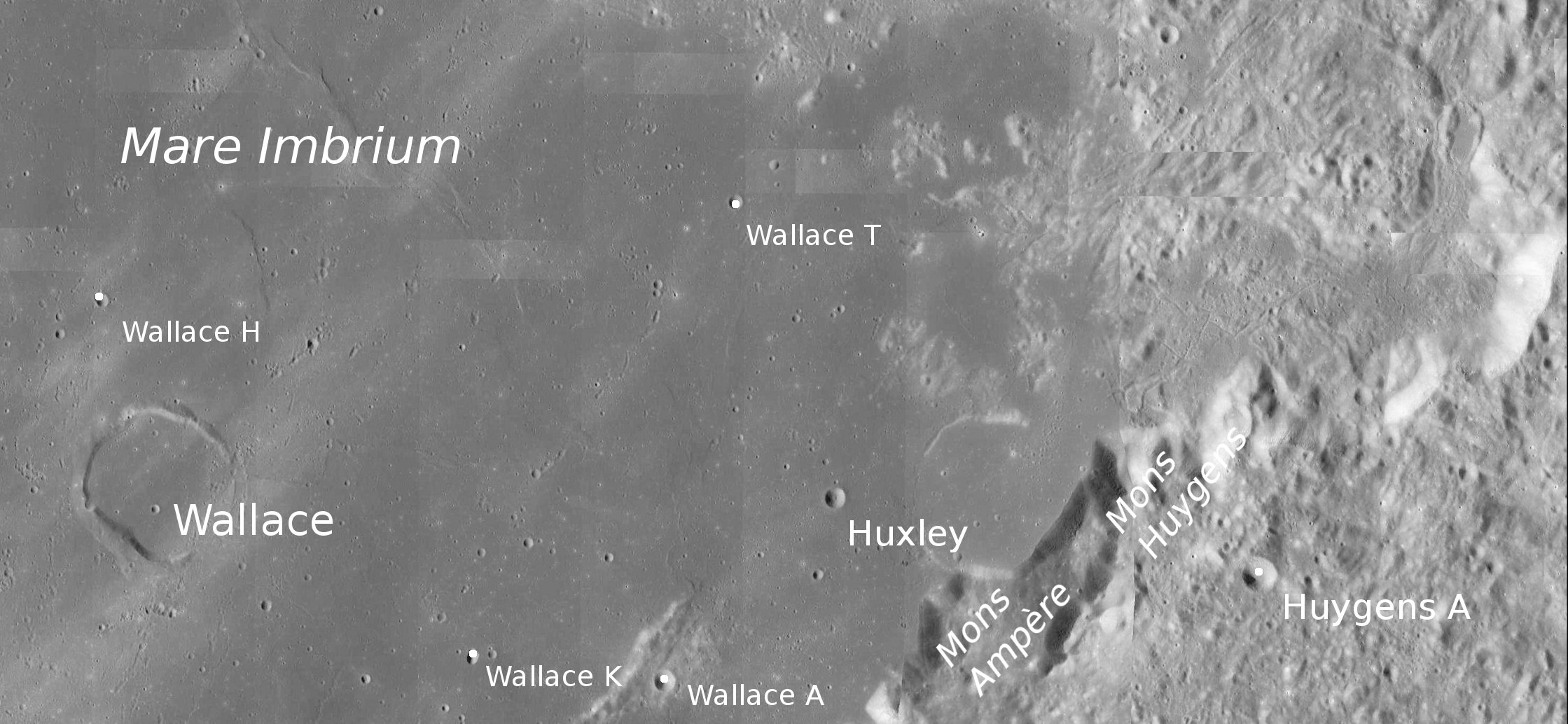
Mons Huygens

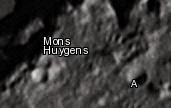
Labeled view from Earth

== See also ==
- List of tallest mountains in the Solar System
- Astrogeology
- Selenean summit
