= Boösaule Montes =

Tallest mountain of Jupiter's moon Io

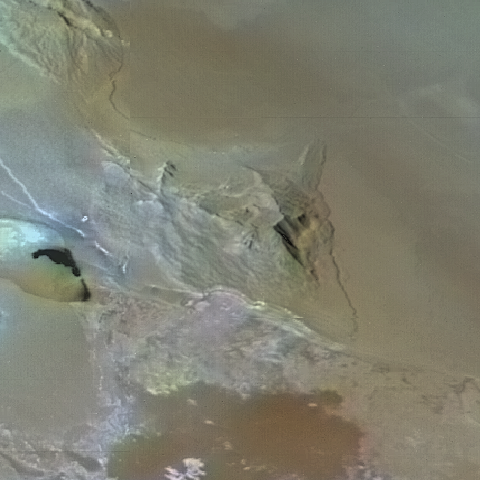
- South Boösaule by Voyager 1 (1979)
- Location: Io (moon)
- Coordinates: 9.7°S 88.9°E
- Surface area: 17,900 km^{2} (6,900 sq mi)
- Dimensions: 145×159 km
- Peak: 17.5 km (10.9 mi) to 18.2 km (11.3 mi); 57,415 ft (17,500 m) to 59,711 ft (18,200 m)

South Boösaule Mons (/ˌboʊ.ɒˈsɔːliː/), the highest mountain of Jupiter's moon Io, is one of the tallest mountains in the Solar System. It is located just northwest of the volcano Pele, in the Boösaule Montes.

The official name of the mountain range was given in honor of the cave in Greece where Io gave birth to Epaphus, and approved by the IAU in 1985.

== Size ==
South Boösaule has a relative height of 18.2 km (17.5 km from the foot), dimensions of 145 × 159 km (the diameter of the mountain range is 540 km), and it covers an area of 17,900 km^{2}.

On the south-east side of the mountain there is a steep cliff up to 15 km high.

== See also ==
- List of tallest mountains in the Solar System
