= Dorothée Dupuis =

French contemporary art curator, critic and publisher (born 1980)

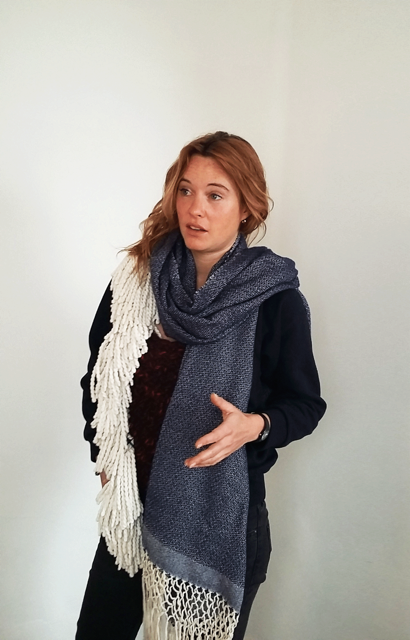
- Born: 1980 (age 45–46)
- Occupations: Art Critic, Curator, Publisher
- Organization: Terremoto Magazine

Dorothée Dupuis (born 1980, Paris) is a Feminist art curator, art critic, and publisher based in Mexico City.

== Career ==
Dupuis holds a MFA from the HEAR (Haute école des arts du Rhin) in Strasbourg (2005). She was assistant curator at the Centre Georges Pompidou from 2005 to 2007. She was Director of Triangle France, a non-profit exhibition and residency program in Marseille, from 2007 to 2012. She was also Director of the French Feminist magazine Petunia starting in 2008. Dupuis is the founder of the online magazine Terremoto.mx, where she currently works as director and chief-editor.

Dupuis’s writings have been published in numerous art catalogues and publications and she is a regular contributor of Flash Art (Milan), Spike Art Daily (Vienna) and Crash Magazine (Paris).

== Selected curation ==
- Cada vez que encuentro la muerte pienso en ti : Emmanuelle Lainé, IFAL, Mexico City, 2015.
- Moucharabieh, co-curated with Céline Kopp and Sandra Patron, Triangle France, Marseille, 2015.
- Yesterday : Renaud Jerez, Lodos, Mexico City, 2014.
- 20 million Mexicans can’t be wrong, panel discussion, Material Art Fair, Mexico City, 2014.
- Les Possédés, Triangle France, Marseille, 2012.
- K. Acker: The Office / Rulin 'n' freaking, cocurated with Géraldine Gourbe, Triangle France, Marseille, 2011.

== Bibliography ==
• La Start-Up, Les Ateliers des Arques, Lot, 2014.
