= Dorothée de Monfreid =

French author and illustrator (born 1973)

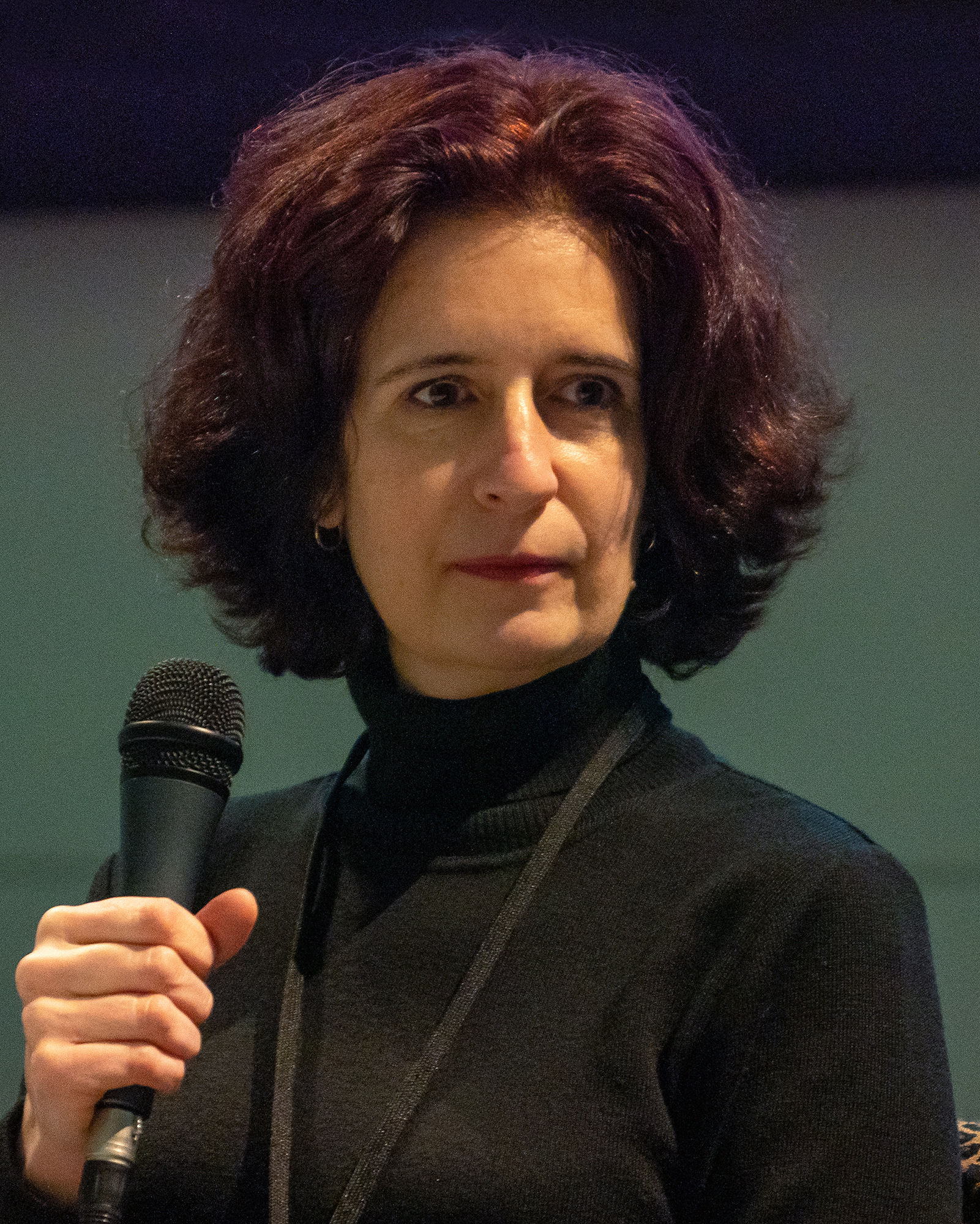
Dorothée de Monfreid

Dorothée de Monfreid (born 1973) is a French author and illustrator.

== Personal Life and Career ==
She worked as a graphic designer, before beginning to work on children's books. She is best known for illustrating I Really Want to Eat a Child. In addition to her work on children's books, Dorothée also creates comics and is an accomplished ukulele player. She lives and works in Paris.

== Recent English publications ==
- 2014 – The Cake, 32pp., ISBN 978-1-927271-44-5
- 2015 – Shhh! I'm Sleeping, 24pp., ISBN 978-1-927271-95-7
- 2016 – A Day With Dogs, 64pp., ISBN 978-1-776570-98-0
