= Mithrim Montes =

Mountains on Titan

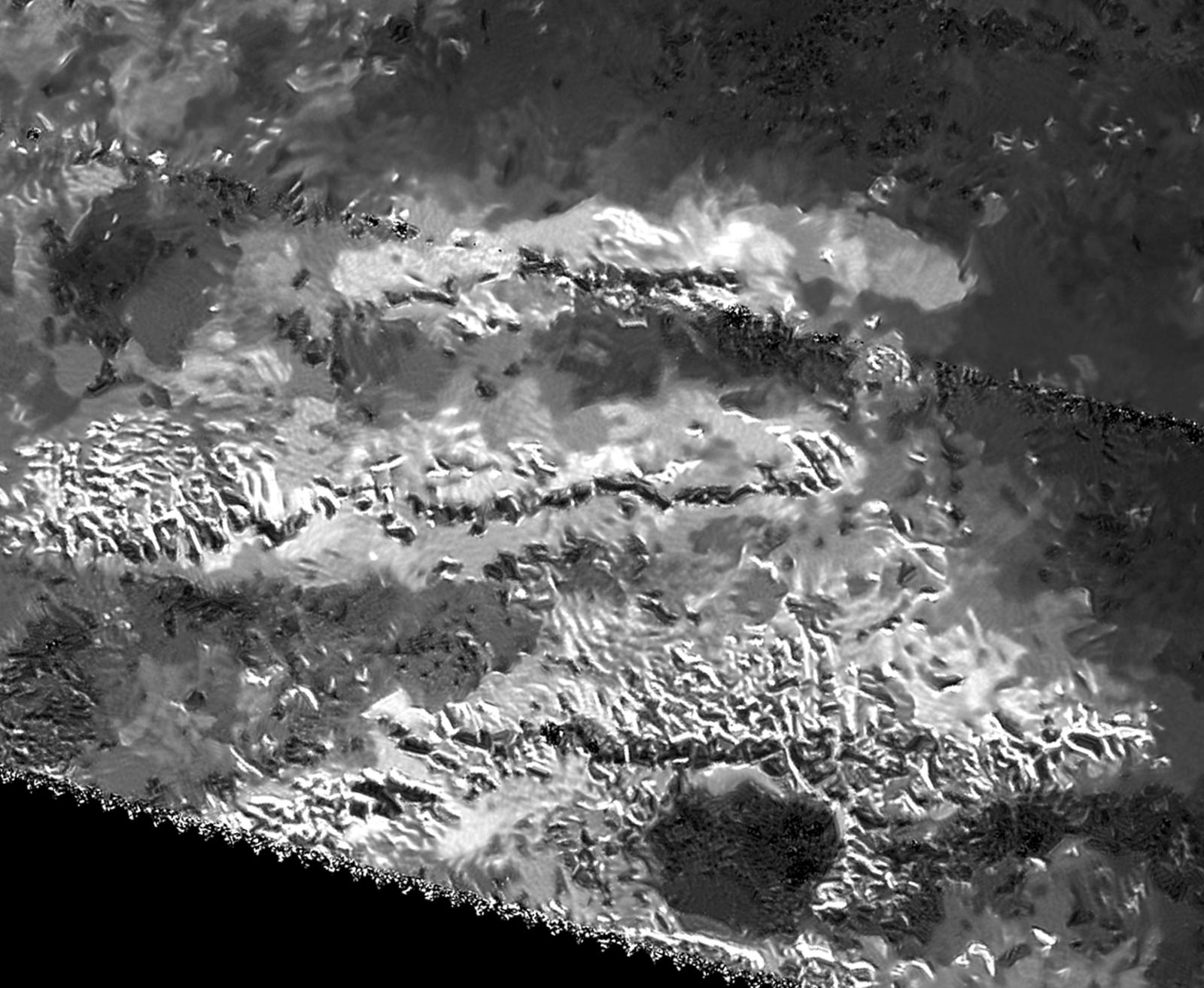
- Despeckled SAR view by Cassini; the tallest peak is near the center of the lower (southern) ridge
- Feature type: Mountain range
- Coordinates: 2°S 127°W
- Diameter: 147 km
- Peak: 3.3 km (2.1 mi) 10,948 ft (3,337 m)
- Eponym: Mithrim Mountains

The Mithrim Montes /ˈmɪθrɪm ˈmɒntiːz/ are a range of mountains on Titan, the largest moon of the planet Saturn. The range is located near Titan's equator, between 1–3° south and 126–8° west and consists of three parallel ridges that are oriented east–west, spaced about 25 km apart. They are located within the region Xanadu. The highest peak is about 3,337 m (10,948 ft) high and is located on the southernmost of the ridges; it is the highest known peak on Titan.

The Mithrim Montes are named after the Mithrim Mountains, a range in J. R. R. Tolkien's fictional world of Middle-earth. This follows a convention that Titanean mountains are named after mountains in Tolkien's work. The name was formally announced on November 13, 2012.

== See also ==
- List of tallest mountains in the Solar System
