= Dorothea, U.S. Virgin Islands =

Coordinates: 18.358568°N 64.961813°W

Dorothea is a settlement on the island of Saint Thomas in the United States Virgin Islands. It is located to the northwest of the capital, Charlotte Amalie.
