= Dorothy (Charonian crater) =

Largest crater on Charon

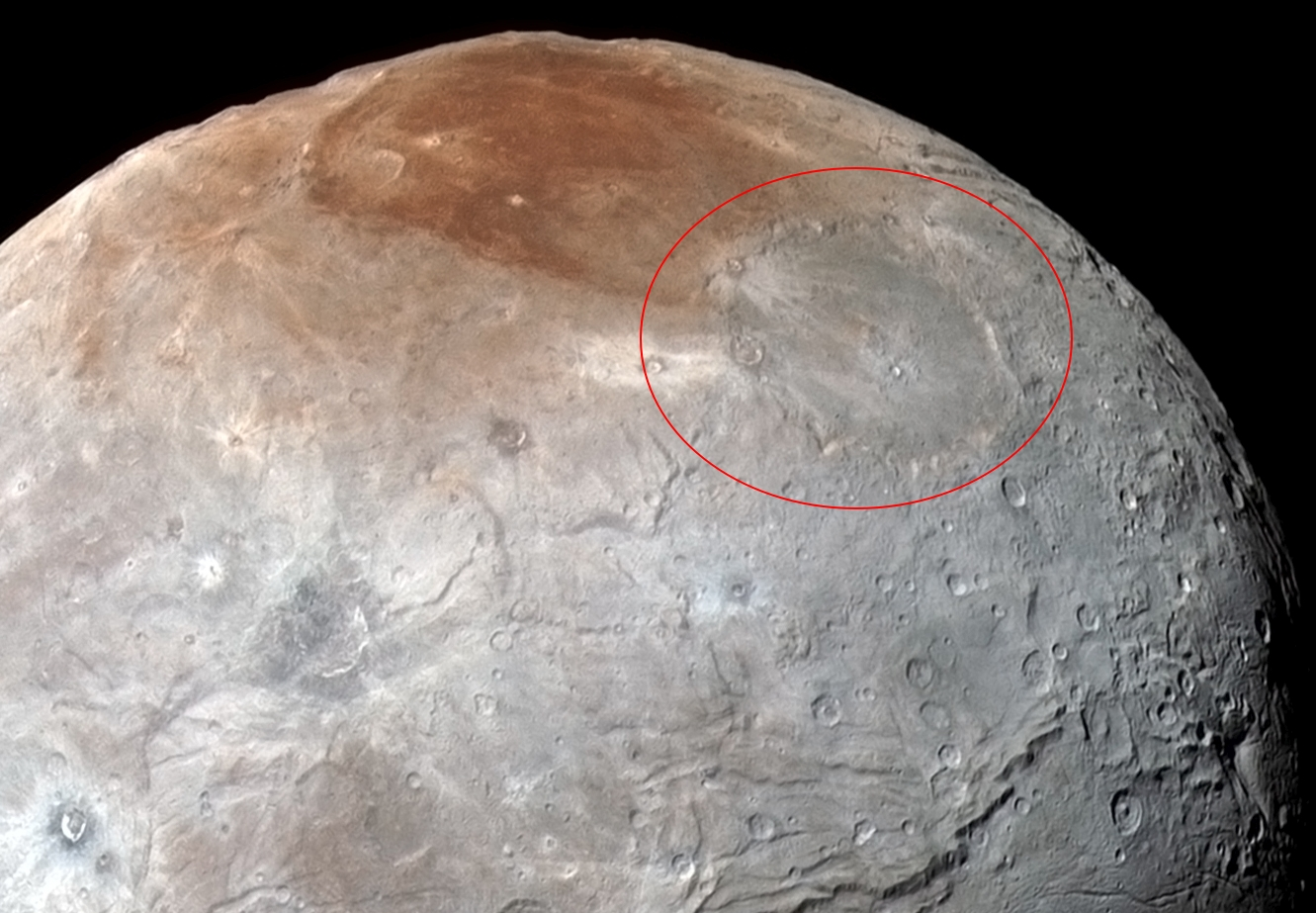
- Dorothy is the largest crater on Charon, appearing in the upper-right of this image.
- Feature type: Central-peak impact crater
- Location: Oz Terra, Charon
- Coordinates: 58.5°N 40.6°E
- Diameter: 261 km
- Depth: 6 km
- Discoverer: New Horizons
- Eponym: Dorothy Gale

Dorothy is the largest known impact basin on Pluto's moon Charon. The crater was discovered by the New Horizons space probe in 2015 during its flyby of Pluto and its moons. It was named after Dorothy Gale from the novel The Wonderful Wizard of Oz; the name was officially approved by the International Astronomical Union (IAU) on 11 April 2018. The crater is located near Charon's north pole, and overlaps the edge of Neverland Regio.

At roughly ~250 km wide, Dorothy is a complex crater with a ~4 km tall central peak. Despite bordering the dark deposits of Neverland Regio, the dark material does not appear to cover the floor of Dorothy, interrupting the roughly circular boundary of Neverland Regio.

== See also ==
- List of geological features on Charon
- Burney (crater) – Multi-ring impact basin on Pluto
- Dorothy (Venusian crater)
