= Euboea Montes =

Mountain on Io, a moon of Jupiter

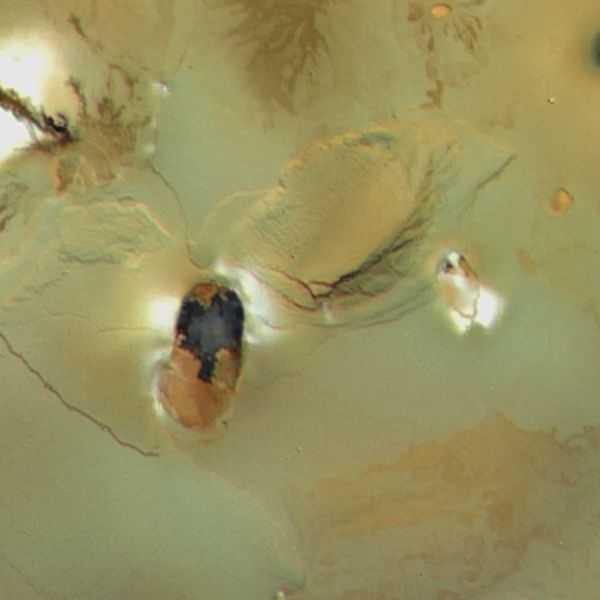
- Voyager 1 view of Euboea Montes; the main massif is to upper right of center; the dark oval to its lower left is Creidne Patera. North is at top.
- Location: Io
- Coordinates: 48.89°S 338.77°W
- Peak: 10.5 km (6.5 mi) 34,449 ft (10,500 m)

Euboea Montes (/juːˈbiːə ˈmɒntiːz/) is a mountain on Io, a moon of Jupiter. Its coordinates are at 48.89°S 338.77°W. It is about 10.5±1 km high, and was formed by tilting of a crustal block, with subsequent modification by a very large landslide.

== Physical characteristics ==
Euboea Montes is rugby ball shaped (175 km by 240 km), located about 40 kilometers east of Creidne Patera caldera. It has an altitude of 10.5 km. There is a curved ridge crest which divides Euboea Montes into two sections: the steep, southern flank with an uneven surface of rounded mounds and the smoother, northern flank sloping about 6° to the northwest. At the base of the northern flank is a thick, ridged deposit with rounded margins.

== Tectonic formation and landslide ==
Schenk and Bulmer used their observations of Voyager 1 images, measurements of heights on the digital elevation map generated from the images, and analogies to Earth structures to characterize Euboea Montes. According to them, the mountain is one block of crustal material, due to its polygonal, relatively intact shape. The block was raised and tilted (by about 6°) by thrust faulting. This uplift led to a massive landslide along the mountain's northern flank.

This scenario is directly tied to the recycling of Io's crust. Older crustal pieces are forced to sink as newer material is thrust above them. This old volcanic crustal material is compressed laterally as it sinks. Schenk and Bulmer argue that this global compression on Io is at least partially relieved by thrust faulting and uplift of large crustal blocks. On Earth, a similar mechanism exists, for example in the Black Hills of Dakota.

Schenk and M. H. Bulmer identify the deposit of a possible landslide off Euboea Montes. The thick deposit at the northern flank is interpreted to be from a landslide, and they further point to the shape of the northern flank as evidence for slope failure. The estimated volume of the debris apron is about 25,000 km^{3}. If this is true, then Euboea Montes has arguably one of the largest debris aprons in the Solar System, of a size similar to those formed by landslides in Valles Marineris, around Olympus Mons on Mars, or submarine landslides on Earth.

== See also ==
- List of tallest mountains in the Solar System
