= List of geological features on Ceres =

Ceres

Ceres is a dwarf planet in the asteroid belt that lies between the orbits of Mars and Jupiter. The International Astronomical Union (IAU) has adopted two themes for naming surface features on Ceres: agricultural deities for craters and agricultural festivals for everything else.

As of 2020, the IAU has approved names for 151 geological features on Ceres: craters, montes, catenae, rupēs, plana, tholi, planitiae, fossae and sulci. In July 2018, NASA released a comparison of physical features found on Ceres with similar ones present on Earth.

Piazzi, named after Giuseppe Piazzi, the discoverer of Ceres, is a dark region southwest of Dantu crater in ground-based images that was named before Dawn arrived at Ceres.

== Overview of features ==
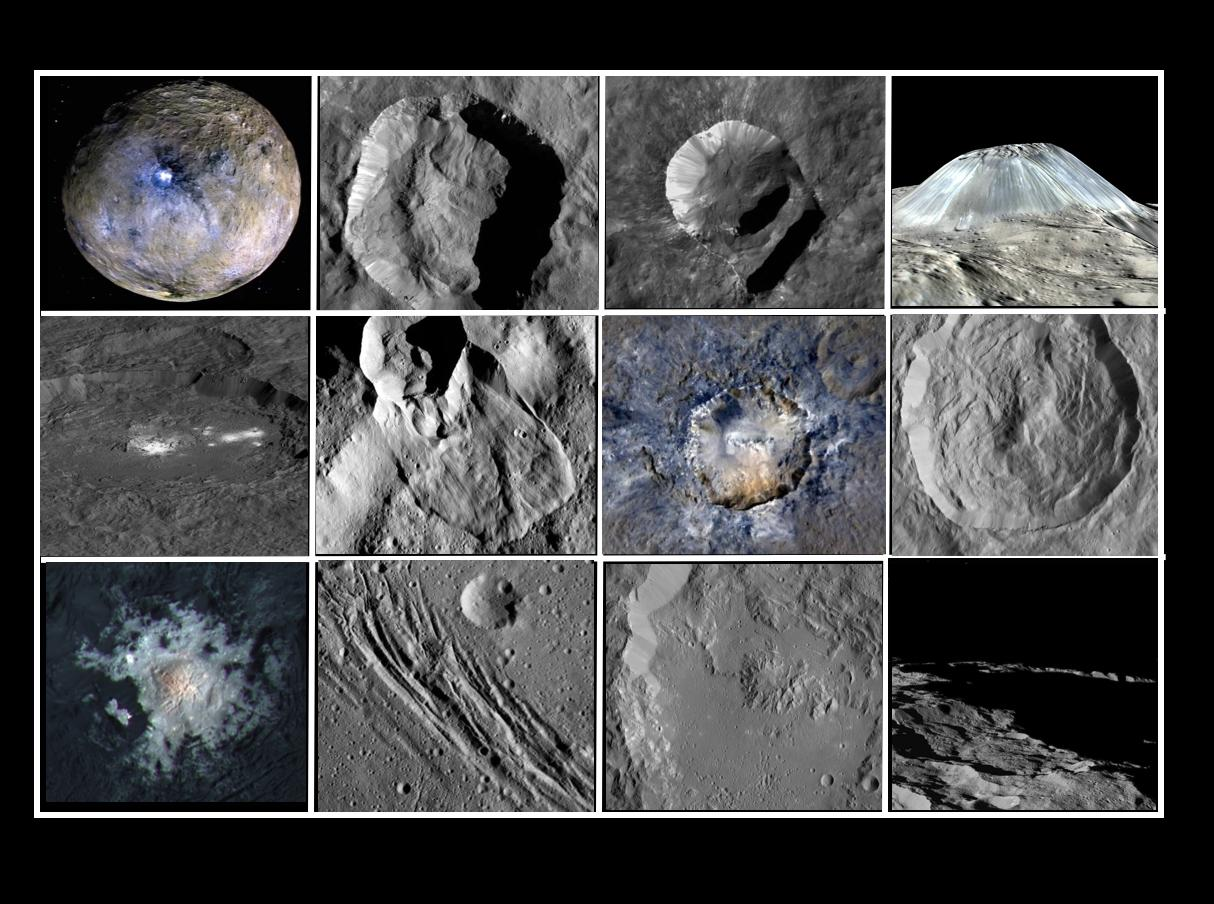
Notable geological features of Ceres

== Catenae ==
Feature	Named after	Diameter (km)	Image
Baltay Catena	Baltai, a Mordvin (Mordvinian) agricultural festival in the Volga River region of Russia	83.5	
Gerber Catena	Gerber, a Udmurt (Volga-Ural region, Russia) agricultural festival after the spring sowing in June	100	
Junina Catenae	Festa Junina, Brazilian festival with a rural theme held in June at the end of the rainy season to give thanks for fertile rain	263	
Pongal Catena	Thai Pongal, Tamil harvest festival observed in mid-January, a time to give thanks to nature	95.5	
Samhain Catenae (Note: Name changed from Samhain Catena (singular) to Samhain Catenae (plural) and boundary expanded from 168 km to 715 km.)	Samhain, the Gaelic festival at the end of the harvest season, which was observed in Ireland and Scotland during seven days in October and November, nearly halfway between the autumn equinox and the winter solstice	715	
Uhola Catenae	Uhola, a Nigerian (Zuru) harvest festival	400	

== Craters ==
Ceres is saturated with impact craters. Many have a central pit or bright spot.

In the first batch of 17 names approved by the IAU, craters north of 20° north latitude had names beginning with A–G (with Asari being the furthest north), those between 20° north and south latitude beginning with H–R, and those further south beginning with S–Z (with Zadeni being the furthest south).

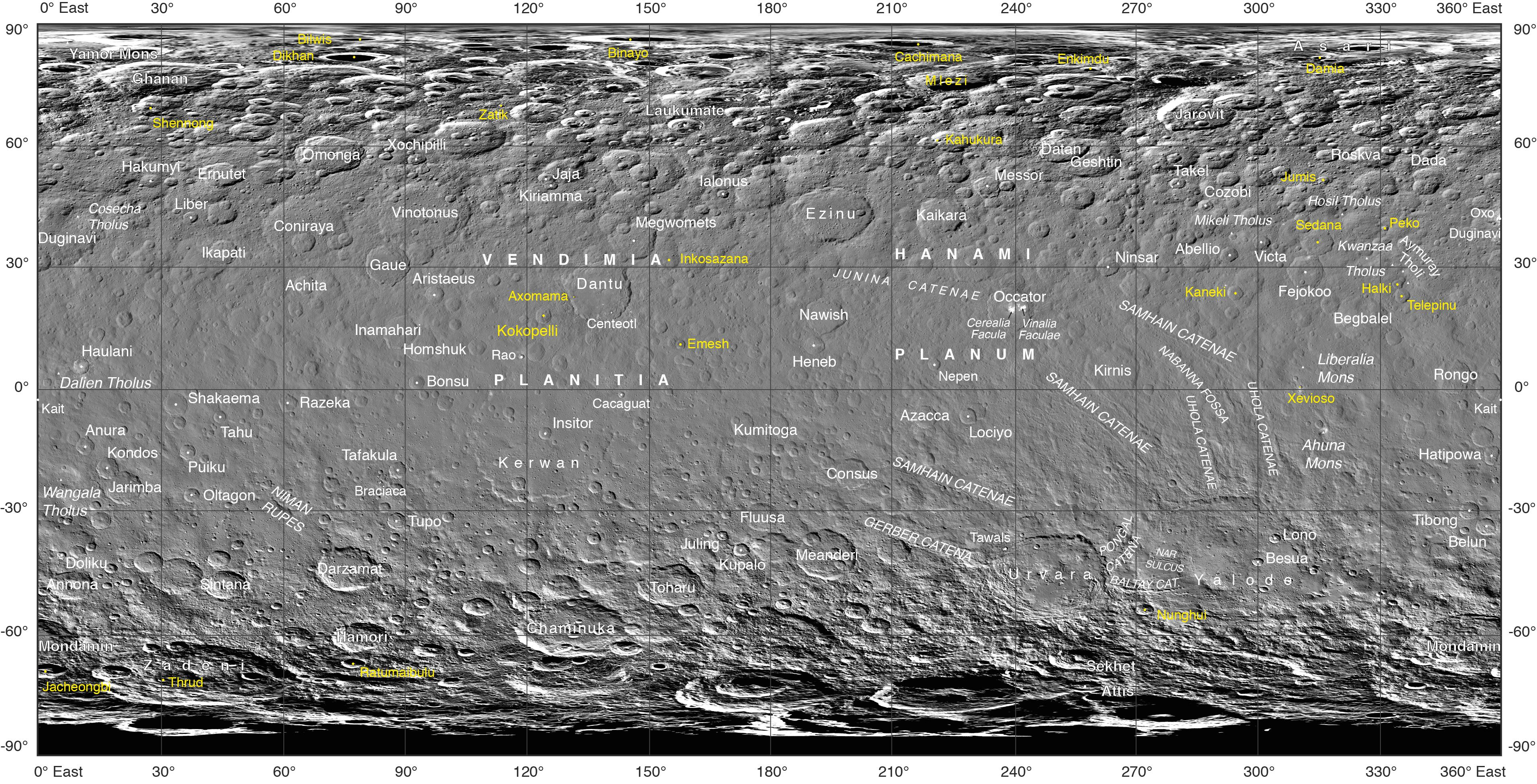
Official nomenclature of Ceres (September 2017)

Feature	Named after	Diameter (km)	Image
Abellio	Abellio, Gaul (Celtic) god of the apple tree	32	
Achita	Achita, a Tiv god of agriculture (Close-up Image-1)	40	
Annona	Annona, Roman goddess of crops and of the harvest	60	
Anura	Anura, a Arawak (Guyana) spirit of the tobacco seeds	37	
Aristaeus	Aristaeus, Greek god of agriculture	35.8	
Asari	Asari, an Assyrian god of agriculture (in the image at right, Asari is just above center)	56	
Attis	Attis, Greek and Phrygian god of vegetation and of fertility	22	
Axomama	Axomamma, an Incan goddess of potatoes	5	
Azacca	Azaka Medeh, Haitian loa of agriculture (Close-up Image-1; Close-up Image-2)	49.91	
Begbalel	Bagbalel, a Yapese guardian of the taro fields who controls the yield of the crops	102	
Belun	Belun, a Belarusian god of the fields	36.04	
Besua	Besuā, a minor Egyptian grain god	17	
Bilwis	Bilwis, a German corn spirit	7	
Binayo	Binayo, a Mangyan female spirit, caretaker of rice spirits	16	
Bonsu	Bonsu, a Batek god who watches over the fruits and flowers	31	
Braciaca	Celtic mythology god of malt	8	
Cacaguat	Nicaraguan god of cacao	13.6	
Centeotl	Centeotl, Aztec god of maize and agriculture	6	
Chaminuka	Shona (Zimbabwe) spirit who provides rains in times of droughts (Close-up Image)	122	
Coniraya	Coniraya, Inca lunar deity responsible for agricultural terracing and irrigation	135	
Consus	Consus, ancient Roman agricultural god who watched over the harvested and stored crop.	64	
Cozobi	Cozobi, Zapotec (south Mexico) god of maize and of abundant food	24	
Dada	Nigerian god of vegetables	12	
Damia	Greek goddess of the cornfields and crops	7	
Dantu	Dantu, Ga god associated with the planting of grain (Close-up Image-1; Close-up Image-2; Close-up Image-3; Close-up Image-4)	126	
Darzamat	Dārza māte; Latvian deity, 'mother of the garden'	92	
Datan	Polish god of the tilling of the soil (Close-up Image-1; Close-up Image-2; Close-up Image-3; Close-up Image-4; Close-up Image-5)	60	
Dikhan	Dikhan baba; Kazakh pre-Islamic deity of farming	21	
Doliku	Dahomeyan (Benin) god of the fields	15	
Duginavi	Kogi (northern Colombia) god who taught people agriculture	155	
Emesh	Sumerian god of vegetation and agriculture	20	
Enkimdu	Sumerian god of farming	9	
Ernutet	Ernutet, Egyptian cobra-headed goddess of the harvest (Close-up Image-1; Close-up Image-2; Close-up Image-3 / organics detected)	53.4	
Ezinu	Sumerian goddess of grain (Close-up Image-1; Close-up Image-2; Close-up Image-3; Close-up Image-4; Close-up Image-5)	116	
Fejokoo	Aboh (Igbo) deity who provided the yam (in the image at right, Fejokoo is just right of center) (Close-up Image)	68	
Fluusa	Oscan (ancient southern Italy) goddess of flowers, counterpart of the Roman goddess Flora.	60	
Gaue	Germanic goddess to whom offerings are made for the rye harvest (Close-up Image-1; Close-up Image-2; Close-up Image-3)	80	
Geshtin	Sumerian goddess of the grapevine and wine (Close-up Image)	80	
Ghanan	Chanan, Tzeltal god of maize (Close-up Image-1; Close-up Image-2; Close-up Image-3)	68	
Hakumyi	Paraguayan, Brazilian and Bolivian spirit helpful in gardening	29.2	
Hamori	Japanese god, protector of tree leaves (Close-up Image)	60	
Hatipowa	Indian god of agriculture	40	
Haulani	Hau-lani, Hawaiian plant goddess (Context Image)	34	
Heneb	Early Egyptian god of grain, produce and vineyards	39	
Homshuk	Sierra Popoluca (south Mexico) spirit of corn (maize)	70	
Ialonus	Ialonus, Celtic (British) god of the cultivated field and of the meadows	16.5	
Ikapati	Lakapati or Ikapati, Tagalog goddess of the cultivated lands (Close-up Image-1; Close-up Image-2; Close-up Image-3; Close-up Image-4; Close-up Image-5)	50	
Inamahari	One of a pair (male and female) of Catawba (South Carolina) deities invoked for success at the sowing season	68	
Inkosazana	Inkosazana, the Zulu agricultural goddess	40	
Insitor	Insitor, helper god of Ceres and Roman agricultural deity in charge of the sowing	26	
Jacheongbi	Jacheongbi, Korean goddess of agriculture in Jeju who is said to have brought 5 grains to the island.	31	
Jaja	Abkhaz harvest goddess	22	
Jarimba	Yarimba, Antakirinya (Australia) god of flowers and fruit	69	
Jarovit	Jarovit (Yarovit), proto-Slavic god of fertility and harvest, who comes down to the Underworld after each harvest and returns each spring (Close-up Image-1; Closeup Image-2)	66	
Juling	Orang Asli (formerly also called Sakai people, now a term for separate and distinct group)/ (Malaysia) spirit of the crops (Close-up Image)	20	
Jumis	Jumis, Latvian god of fertility of the field.	15	
Kahukura	Kahukura, Maori god of kumara (sweet potato) crops.	6.3	
Kaikara	Konjo and Banyoro (Uganda) goddess of harvest	72	
Kait	Hattic goddess of grain (Asia Minor). Defines zero degrees longitude on Ceres	0.4	
Kaneki	Micronesian (Pohnpei/Ponape Island, Caroline Islands) god of the coconut palm	31.5	
Kerwan	Hopi spirit of the sprouting maize (Close-up Image)	280	
Kiriamma	Veddan (Sri Lanka) goddess and provider of food ('milk mother')	18.7	
Kirnis	Kirnis, Lithuanian spirit and guardian of cherry trees (in the image at right, Kirnis is near the terminator at 4 o'clock from the bright spots) (Close-up Image-1; Close-up Image-2)	115	
Kokopelli	Pueblo fertility deity who presides over agriculture	34	
Kondos	Finnish agricultural deity	44	
Kumitoga [kumiˈtoŋa]	Kumitoga (Kumitonga), Tuamotuan goddess of feasting mats and one of three goddesses of plant life	96	
Kupalo	Russian (Slavic) god of vegetation and of the harvest (Close-up Image-1; Close-up Image-2; Close-up Image-3)	26	
Laukumate	Latvian spirit, 'mother of the fields'	29.7	
Liber	Liber, Roman god of agriculture (Close-up Image)	23	
Lociyo	Zapotec (Mexico) deity to whom a ceremony is performed when the first chilli plant is cut	37.8	
Lono	Lono, Hawaiian god of agriculture (Close-up Image)	20	
Meanderi	Ngaing (New Guinea) goddess of taro, sugar cane and other foods (Close-up Image)	103	
Megwomets	Yurok (California) dwarf god of acorns and distributor of vegetal abundance	78.7	
Messor	Messor, helper god of Ceres and Roman god of harvesting, of cutting of the grain (Close-up Image-1; Close-up Image-2; Close-up Image-3)	40	
Mlezi	Name of god Tilo as "Food-Giver" (Tonga tribes of Malawi and Zambia)	41.5	
Mondamin	Ojibwe corn (maize) god (Lake Superior area, Canada and the United States) (Close-up Image-1; Close-up Image-2; Close-up Image-3; Close-up Image-4; Close-up Image-5)	126	
Nawish	Acoma guardian of the field	77	
Nepen	Egyptian god of rain	26.4	
Ninsar	Ninsar, Sumerian goddess of plants and vegetation	40	
Nunghui	Canelos Quichua (Ecuador) female spirit of garden soil and pottery clay	22	
Occator	Occator, helper god of Ceres and Roman agricultural deity of the harrowing. "Region A" in ground-based images (Close-up Image-1; Close-up Image-2; Close-up Image-3; Close-up Image-4; Close-up Image-5; Close-up Image-6; Close-up Image-7; Close-up Image-8; Close-up Image-9; Close-up Image-10; Close-up Image-11; Close-up Image-12)	92	
Oltagon	Philippine agricultural goddess	28	
Omonga	Mori (Tomori) rice spirit that dwells in the Moon (Close-up Image)	77	
Oxo /ˈɒʃoʊ/	Candomblé (and Yoruba) god of agriculture (Context Image; Close-up Image - "Water-Ice" Detected; Close-up Image)	10	
Peko	Seto (southeast Estonia) fertility god	11	
Piuku	Carib (Barama River, Guyana) god of the manioc	31	
Rao	Mangarevan god involved in the planting of turmeric (Close-up Image)	12	
Ratumaibulu	Fijian serpent god of agriculture and the underworld	20	
Razeka	Arabian tribal god worshipped as the provider of food	38.38	
Rongo	Rongo, Maori god of cultivation (Close-up Image)	68	
Roskva	Teutonic goddess who symbolises the ripe fields of harvest	22	
Sekhet	Egyptian name of Isis as goddess of cultivated lands and fields (Close-up Image)	41	
Shakaema	Shakaëma, Jivaro (Ecuador and Peru) god of vegetation invoked in the planting and cultivation of bananas	49	
Shennong	Shennong, Chinese buffalo-headed deity of agriculture	32.5	
Sintana	Kogi deity who produced fertile black earth (Close-up Image-1; Close-up Image-2; Close-up Image-3)	61	
Tafakula	Tongan (Polynesia) goddess invoked for favourable seasons for the crops	34	
Tahu	Maori (New Zealand) personification of all food	25	
Takel	Yak Takel, Semang goddess of the tuber harvest (Close-up Image)	21	
Tawals	Polish god of the fields and of the tilling	8.8	
Telepinu	Telepinu Hittite god of fertility and vegetation	31	
Thrud	Scandinavian goddess who "signifies the seed"	7.8	
Tibong	Land Dayak (Borneo) malevolent spirit who devours and depletes the rice	37	
Toharu	Pawnee god of food and vegetation (Close-up Image)	87	
Tupo	An obscure Mangarevan god of disorder (perhaps the same as Tu or Tupa), involved in turmeric planting (Close-up Image-1; Close-up Image-2)	37	
Urvara	Ancient titular deity of plants (Iranian) and fertile fields (Indian) (Close-up Image-1; Close-up Image-2; Close-up Image-3; Close-up Image-4; Close-up Image-5)	163	
Victa	Roman goddess of food and nourishment	30	
Vinotonus	Britonic (Celtic) god of the vine (wine)	140	
Xevioso	Fon (Benin/Dahomey) god of thunder and fertility	8.5	
Xochipilli	Xochipilli, Aztec fertility god associated with maize and flowers; patron of music and dance	22.7	
Yalode	Dahomeyan goddess worshipped by women at harvest rites (Close-up Image-1; Close-up Image-2; Close-up Image-3; Close-up Image-4; Close-up Image-5; Close-up Image-6; Close-up Image-7)	260	
Zadeni	Zadeni, ancient Georgian god of bountiful harvests (Close-up Image-1; Close-up Image-2; Close-up Image-3)	129.28	
Zatik	Armenian god of fertility and vegetation	4	

== Faculae (bright spots) ==
A few of the brightest faculae were numbered during the approach of the Dawn spacecraft.

Feature	Named after	Number	Location	Image
Cerealia Facula	Cerealia, Ancient Roman festival of the grain goddess Ceres	5	Occator crater (center)	
Pasola Facula	Pasola, rice-planting festival on Sumba Island	5	Occator crater (center)	
Vinalia Faculae	Vinalia, Roman wine festivals	5	Occator crater (east)	

Number	Location	Image
1	Haulani facula	
2	Dantu faculae	
3	Kupalo facula	
4	Probably south of Nawish crater	

== Fossae ==
Feature	Named after	Diameter (km)	Image
Nabanna Fossa	Nabanna, Bengali harvest festival for the 'new rice'	168	

== Labes ==
Feature	Named after	Diameter (km)	Image
Dankdag Labes	Dankdag, Dutch day of thanksgiving	23.5	
Onam Labes	Onam, harvest festival in Kerala	4.8	
Sukkot Labes	Sukkot, Jewish autumn festival	11	

== Labyrinthus ==
Feature	Named after	Diameter (km)	Image
Makahiki Labyrinthus	Makahiki, Hawaiian harvest festival	22	

== Montes ==
Feature	Named after	Diameter (km)	Image
Ahuna Mons /əˈhuːnə/	Ahuna, the Sumi (Nagaland, northeast India) traditional post-harvest festival that signifies the celebration of the season's harvest's thanksgiving (Close-up Image)	20	
Liberalia Mons /lɪbərˈeɪliə/	Liberalia, ancient Roman festival to honour Liber and Libera, deities of the vine, worshipped, along with Ceres as fertility gods, held on 17 March	90	
Yamor Mons (Note: Name changed from Ysolo Mons to Yamor Mons. See: "Name changed on Ceres". Astrogeology. USGS. 7 December 2016.) /ˈjæmɔːr/	Yamor, an Ecuadorean maize festival	17	

== Plana ==
Feature	Named after	Diameter (km)	Image
Hanami Planum (Note: Name changed from Erntedank Planum to Hanami Planum.)	Hanami, Japanese cherry blossom festival	555	

== Planitiae ==
The three planitiae may be large and largely obliterated craters.

Feature	Named after	Diameter (km)	Image
Vendimia Planitia /vɛnˈdɪmiə/	The Fiesta Nacional de la Vendimia grape-harvest festival in Mendoza, Argentina during the first week of March, one of the most important festivals in the country	800	

== Regiones ==
Feature	Named after	Diameter (km)	Image
Homowo Regio	Homowo, Ga harvest festival	360	

== Rupēs ==
Feature	Named after	Diameter (km)	Image
Niman Rupes	Hopi (southwestern United States) ritual ending the kachina (spiritual beings) season, celebrating the kachinas' return to their spiritual home in July and their part in the blossoming of plant life (Related Image)	45	

== Sulci ==
Feature	Named after	Diameter (km)	Image
Nar Sulcus	Azerbaijani festival of the pomegranate harvest, held October–November in Goychay, the centre of pomegranate cultivation in the country	63	

== Tholi ==
Feature	Named after	Diameter (km)	Image
Aymuray Tholi	Quechua (Peru) harvest festival in May, meaning 'the song of the harvest'	81	
Bagach Tholus	Bagach(Багач), Belarusian harvest festival held on 21 September	4.3	
Cerealia Tholus	Cerealia, the major festival in Ancient Rome to celebrate the grain goddess Ceres (8 days in mid- to late-April)	3.2	
Cosecha Tholus	Colombian harvest festival (Fiestas de la Cosecha), held in August in Pereira	50	
Dalien Tholus	Bon Dalien, Khmer (Cambodian) festival at the end of the rice harvest (January to February)	22	
Hosil Tholus	Hosil bayrami, Uzbek (Central Asia) cotton harvest festival	31	
Kekri Tholus	Kekri, a Finnish festival held on the first Saturday of November.	4.6	
Kwanzaa Tholus	Kwanzaa, African-American festival based on ancient African harvest festivals (from 26 December to 1 January)	48	
Lohri Tholus	Lohri, Punjabi harvest festival on January 13.	3.8	
Lughnasa Tholus	Lughnasa Celtic harvest festival traditionally celebrated on August 1	35.87	
Mikeli Tholus	Miķeļi, Latvian harvest festival held at the end of September (the autumn equinox)	37	
Wangala Tholus	Wangala, Garo people (Meghalaya and Assam states, northeast India and Bangladesh) post-harvest three-day festival that marks the end of the agricultural year (November)	50	

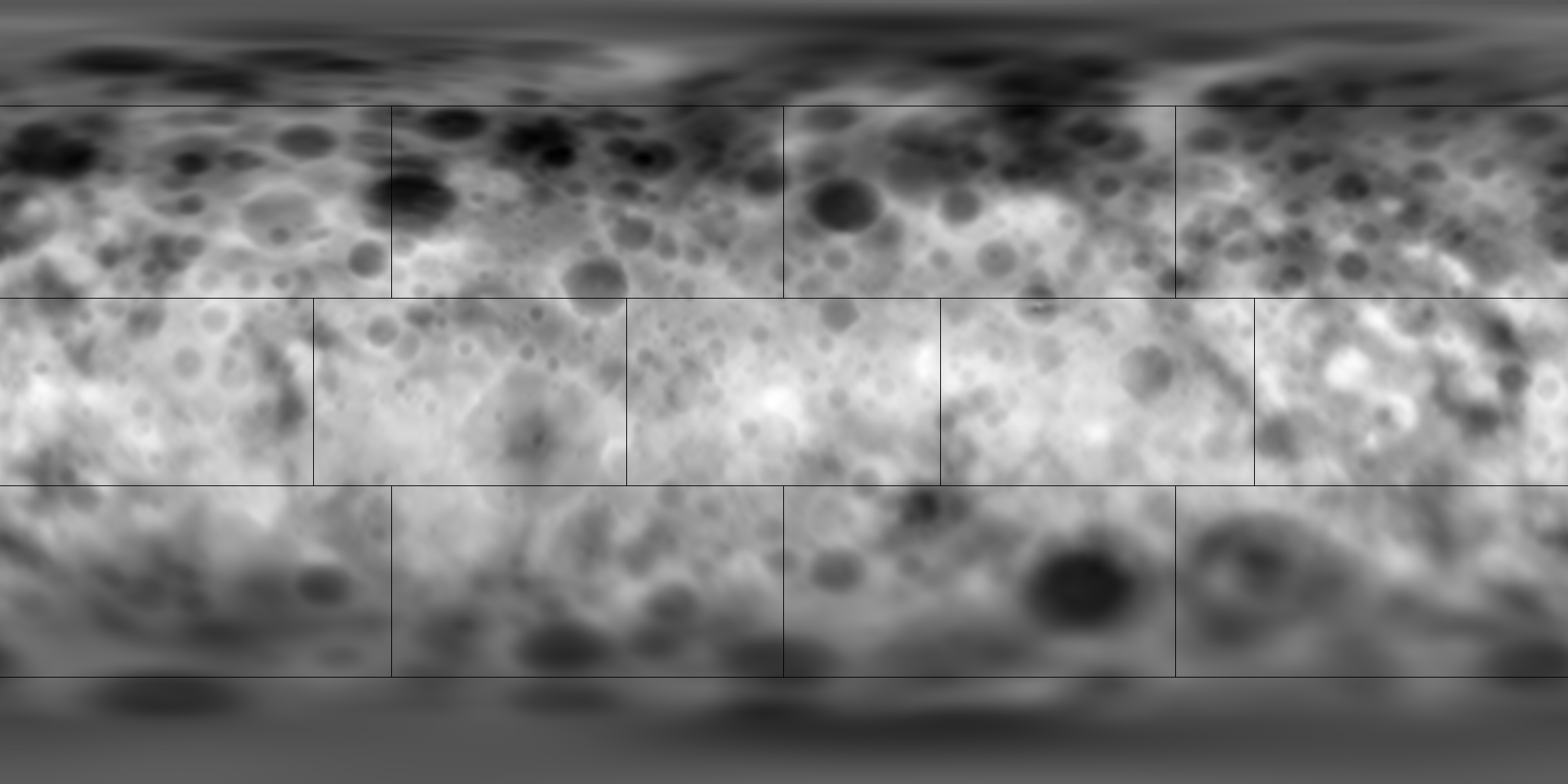
KUMBA
Topographic map of Ceres as of February 2015. Darker areas represent lower elevations, and brighter areas represent higher elevations.
[]
