= Geology of Ceres =

Geologic structure and composition of Ceres

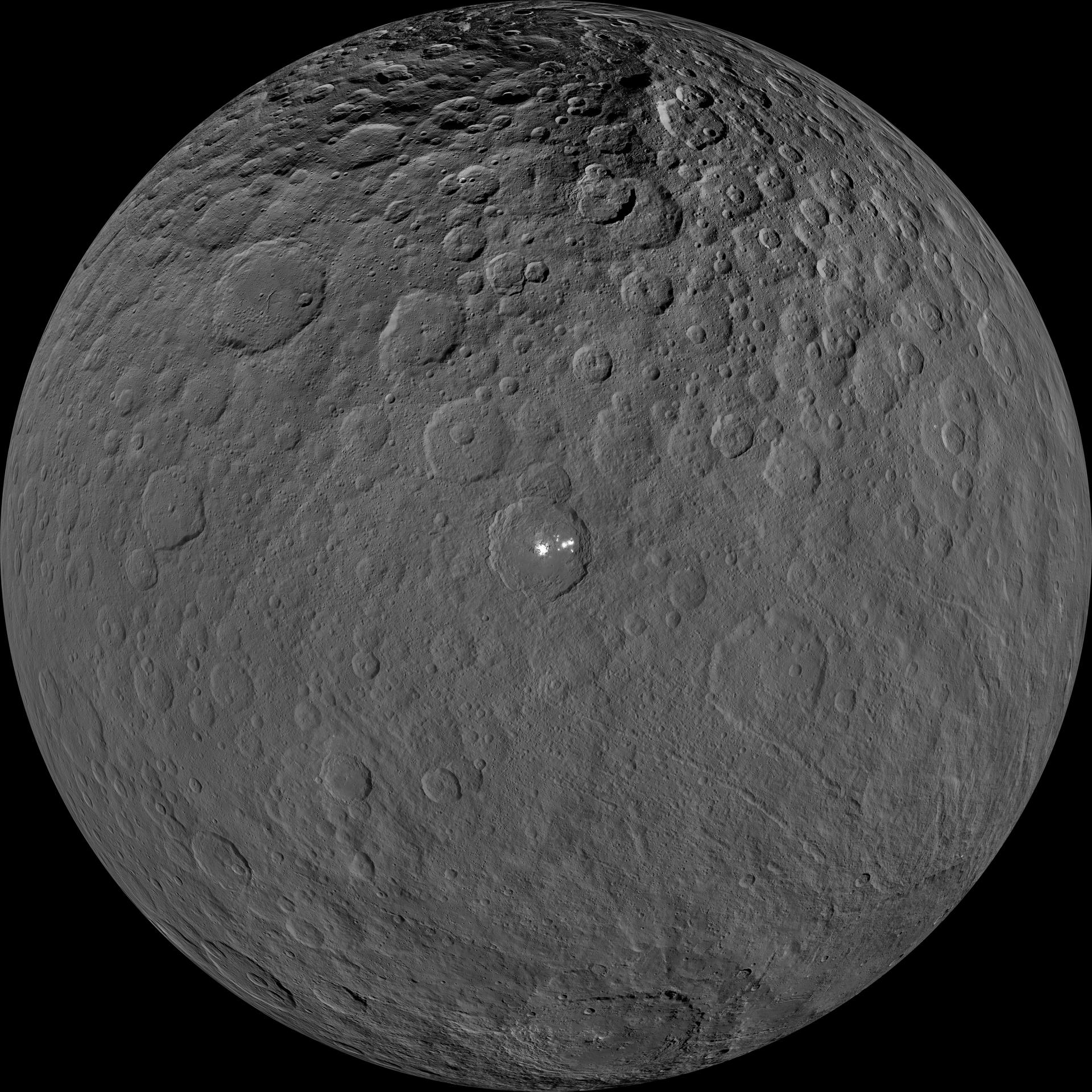
Dawn spacecraft high resolution view of Ceres centered on Occator Crater. Note the two bright spots known as Cerealia and Vinalia Faculae. NASA/JPL-Caltech/UCLA/MPS/DLR/IDA.

The geology of Ceres is the scientific study of the surface, crust, and interior of the dwarf planet Ceres. It seeks to understand and describe Ceres' composition, landforms, evolution, and physical properties and processes. The study draws on fields such as geophysics, remote sensing, geochemistry, geodesy, and cartography (see Planetary geology).

Before the arrival of NASA's Dawn spacecraft in 2015, knowledge of Ceres' geology was limited to spectroscopic studies from Earth-orbital and ground-based telescopes, which tentatively identified the dwarf planet's overall surface composition. Thermodynamic models of Ceres' interior and evolution were also constructed based on properties such as its shape and bulk density. Data from the Dawn mission not only confirmed many of the results of earlier studies, but dramatically increased the understanding of Ceres' composition and evolution, moving it from a largely astronomical object to a geological one.

At a diameter of 964 km, Ceres is the largest object in the main asteroid belt and comprises about one-third of the belt's total mass. Ceres possesses sufficient gravity to form a rounded, ellipsoid shape, suggesting that it is close to being in hydrostatic equilibrium—one of the conditions for defining a dwarf planet according to the International Astronomical Union (IAU).

Though large relative to asteroids, Ceres is small compared with many other solid bodies in the Solar System. For example, it is only 28% the size of Earth's Moon and 41% that of Pluto, another dwarf planet. It is comparable in size to Saturn's moons Tethys and Dione. Ceres' small size means that it cooled much faster than full-sized planets and larger moons, limiting its degree of thermal evolution.

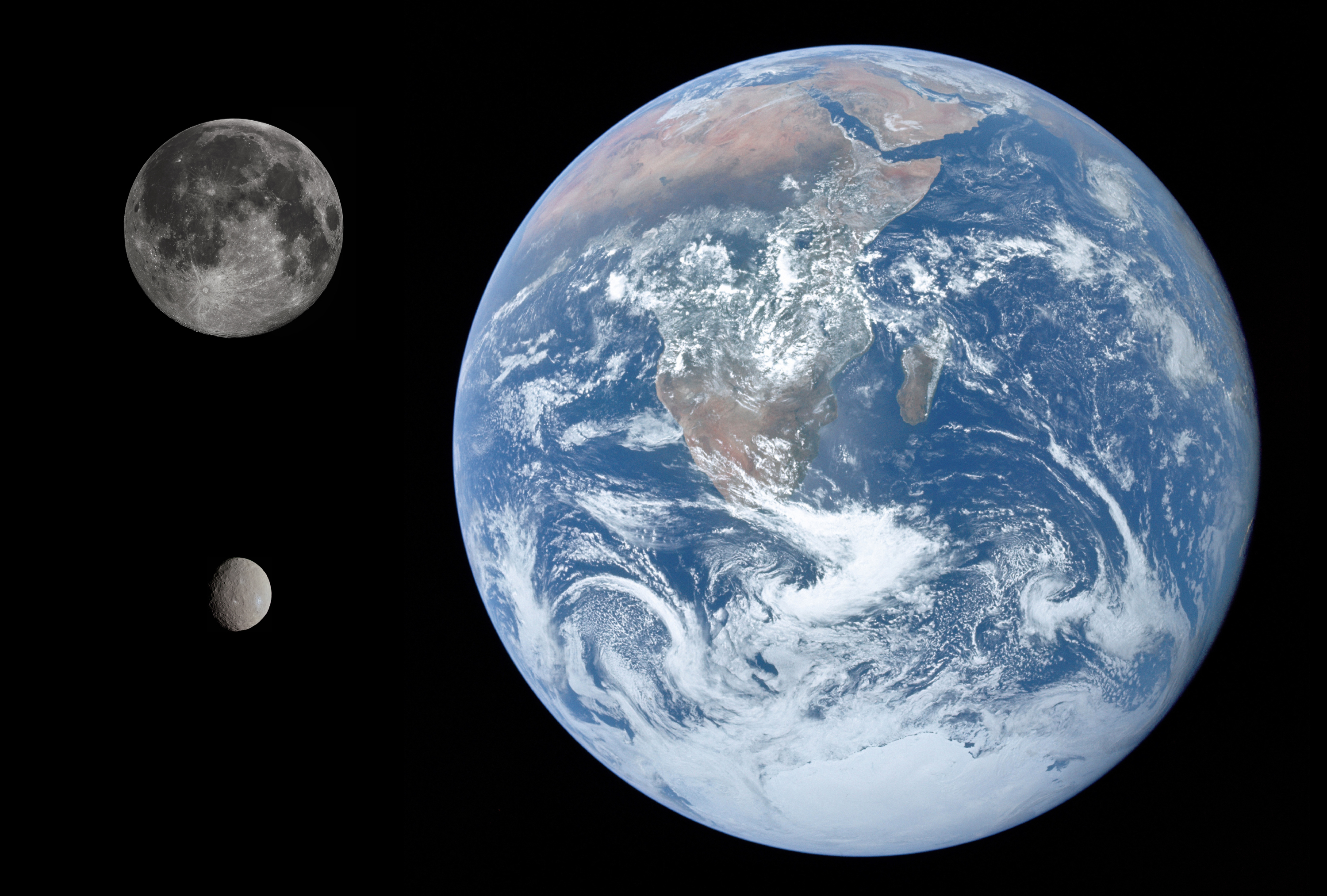
Ceres (bottom left), the Moon and Earth, shown to scale

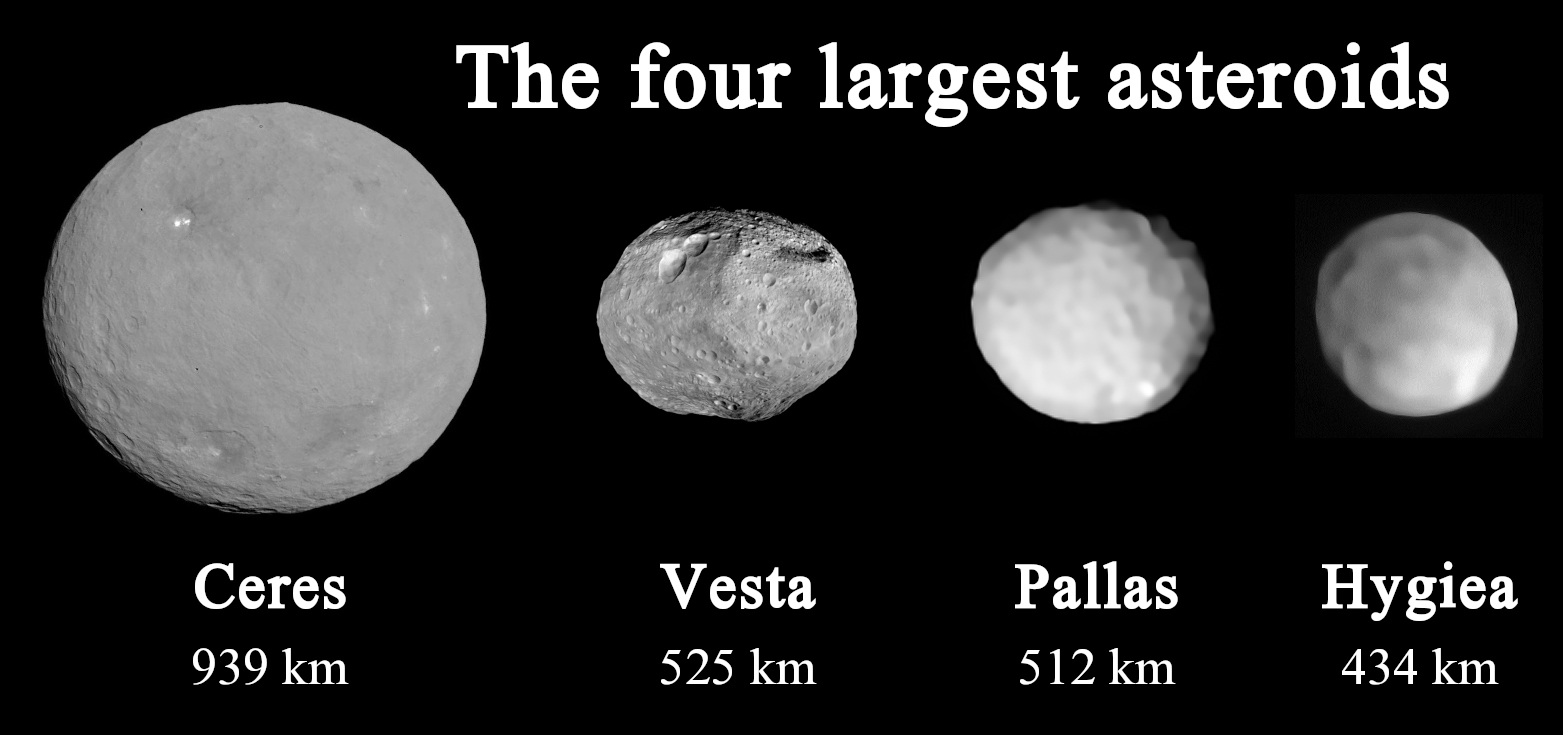
Relative mean diameters of the four largest minor planets in the asteroid belt (dwarf planet Ceres at left)

Ceres' mean density of 2,162 kg/m^{3} is midway between rock (~3,000 kg/m^{3}) and ice (~1,000 kg/m^{3}). This implies that water in some form makes up 17–27% of its total mass. The water is present both as ice and in hydrated minerals. Being the most water-rich body in the inner Solar System after Earth, Ceres is believed to have once hosted a subsurface ocean, the remnant of which may still exist as a global reservoir or as pockets of brines (salty water) at depth. The presence of liquid water has astrobiological significance as any extant water may provide a habitat for life.

Ceres orbits the Sun at a mean distance of 2.77 astronomical units (AU), near the center of the asteroid belt. It receives only 15% of the solar energy as Earth and has a maximum daytime temperature at the equator of 243 K (−30 °C). This temperature is still high enough that surface ice is not stable and tends to sublimate away over geologic timescales.

Ceres is a dark object, having a geometric albedo of 0.094, meaning that on average its surface reflects only 9% of the sunlight striking it. The composition of the material contributing to the low albedo remains uncertain, but graphitized carbon compounds or the mineral magnetite have been suggested.

Ceres has spectral similarities to C-type asteroids, which are rich in volatiles and carbonaceous compounds. Ceres is also sometimes classified as a G-type asteroid, which is a subtype of the Tholen C-class and characterized by abundant phyllosilicates, such as clay minerals. Ceres is not associated with any asteroid family or known meteorites.

== Dawn mission ==
Dawn was launched in September 2007 with the mission of studying Ceres and the asteroid 4 Vesta. The spacecraft entered orbit around Vesta on 16 July 2011, and completed a 14-month survey mission before leaving for Ceres in late 2012. It went into orbit around Ceres on 6 March 2015. Dawn performed near-global geological, chemical, and geophysical mapping of Ceres until its hydrazine fuel was depleted on 31 October 2018.

Dawn's scientific payload consisted of two redundant multispectral Framing Cameras (FCs), a visible and infrared mapping spectrometer (VIR), and a Gamma-Ray and Neutron Detector spectrometer (GRaND). The radio communications subsystem was used to map Ceres' gravity field. A magnetometer was originally selected for the mission but was deleted by NASA during development of the payload.

During the primary mission, the FC mapped nearly the entire surface of Ceres at a spatial resolution of 35 m/pixel in the visible channel and 135 m/pixel in color. An 8-position filter wheel permitted panchromatic (clear filter) and spectrally selective imaging (7 narrow band color filters). The broadest filter allowed imaging at wavelengths from 400 to 1050 nm. The main science objectives of the FC were to determine Ceres' physical properties, such as rotational state and global shape, to image surface geomorphology, and to produce high-resolution digital terrain models. Multicolor imaging, in conjunction with the VIR (below), helped in mapping the mineralogy and chemical composition of the Cerean surface.

The VIR was a hyperspectral spectrometer with imaging capability that obtained reflectance spectra of the surface at wavelengths between 0.25 and 5 μm. It used two channels covering the visible (VIS, 0.25–1.05 μm) and infrared (IR, 1–5.1 μm) ranges, with a spectral sampling of 1.8 nm and 9.5 nm, respectively. Its scientific objective was to determine the mineralogy of surface materials through the diagnostic absorption features of common rock-forming minerals. The diagnostic features of minerals expected on Ceres include the 1 μm and 2 μm mafic bands of pyroxene and olivine, the 3 μm water region of the hydration band, the 1.5, 2.0, and 3.0 μm bands of water ice, the 3.9 μm carbonate band, and the 3.2–3.6 μm C–H stretching bands of organic material. The spatial resolution of the spectral images was high enough (100 meters to several kilometers per pixel) to allow associations to be made between mineralogy and surface morphology, linking chemistry with geology.

The GRaND spectrometer measured elemental abundances on a regional to global scale by detecting an element's characteristic gamma ray emissions and neutron radiation activated by high energy cosmic rays. Elements measured included carbon, iron, hydrogen (a proxy for water), potassium, and other silicate-forming elements occurring within approximately the upper meter of the surface. Although spatial resolution was limited, the GRaND instrument's elemental abundances proved complementary with the VIR-derived mineralogy because it was able to detect elements in the shallow subsurface and in polar areas where sunlight was insufficient for the VIR spectrometer.

Lastly, the radio science investigation used X-band Doppler tracking and landscape tracking from optical instruments to determine Ceres' gravity field to high precision. Gravity field measurements, along with a shape model, allowed for estimations of internal mass distribution.

== Global physical properties ==
Tracking of the Dawn spacecraft's orbit using radiometric Doppler and range data and optical surface landmark tracking by stereophotoclinometry have enabled high precision measurement of Ceres' bulk properties. These properties include a total mass of 9.3833599×10^{20} kg and a rotational rate of 952.1532635 deg/day (period of rotation = 9.074170 hours).

Ceres' shape is controlled mainly by gravity and spin, with only a 3% departure from hydrostatic equilibrium. Its best-fit shape is a triaxial ellipsoid with dimensions a = 483.1 km, b = 481.0, km and c = 445.9 km, with c being the north-south axis and a and b the semimajor and semiminor equatorial axes. Combining total mass with volume gives a bulk density of 2,162 kg/m^{3}. Gravity data suggests that Ceres has a mean dimensionless moment of inertia (I/MR^{2}) value of about 0.37 indicating some amount of internal differentiation (a spherical body with a uniform density throughout has a moment of inertia of 0.40 while a body whose mass is mostly concentrated near the center has a moment of inertia closer to 0.30).

== Surface composition ==
During its primary mission, Dawn identified and mapped the mineralogy of almost the entire surface of Ceres. The key instrument for this effort was the VIR imaging spectrometer, but multicolor information from the FC and elemental composition derived from the GRaND instrument played complementary roles.

A sharp absorption feature in the infrared reflectance spectrum at 2.72 μm is characteristic of minerals containing hydroxyl (OH). Comparisons with laboratory spectra indicate that this absorption feature is likely due to the presence of magnesium (Mg)-bearing phyllosilicates such as antigorite (Mg-serpentine) or saponite (Mg-smectite). Another prominent band at 3.06 μm is attributed to ammoniated (NH_{4}^{+}-bearing) phyllosilicates. The specific phyllosilicate containing the ammonium ion is uncertain but is likely some form of Mg-saponite.

Phyllosilicates (see clay minerals) are hydrated silicates produced by aqueous alteration and thus indicative of the presence of liquid water at some point in Ceres’ geological history. Phyllosilicates are ubiquitous across the cerean surface, and their composition is relatively uniform, although their abundances vary.

Also prominent in the infrared are absorption bands at 3.95 μm and 3.4–3.5 μm which are attributed to Mg-bearing carbonate minerals such as magnesite or dolomite. As with the phyllosilicates, carbonate minerals are abundant globally, but the type of carbonate present can depend on specific locations. For example, sodium carbonate (Na_{2}CO_{3}) is abundant in bright spots on the surface (faculae) like those in Occator crater.

The cerean surface also contains a very large amount of dark, spectrally neutral material of uncertain composition. Suggested candidates include graphite, magnetite, and nickel-iron sulfides. Graphite can be produced by the exposure of carbonaceous chondrite material to ultraviolet light and cosmic radiation, a process known as graphitization. It is estimated that the surface of Ceres may have up to 20 wt% carbon.

Localized areas of aliphatic hydrocarbons were identified based on the 3.2–3.6 μm reflectance band. The band is particularly prominent in a 1,000-km^{2} area around the western edge of Ernutet crater.

Even though it is unstable at the surface on geologic timescales, water ice has been detected in the shallow subsurface by the GRaND instrument. The concentration of water ice, as measured by hydrogen abundance, is highest at Ceres’ polar regions (29 wt.% equivalent H_{2}O) and decreases toward the equator.

The GRaND instrument also measured the concentrations of iron (Fe) and potassium (K). The equatorial average Fe concentration was determined to be about 16 wt.%, and the estimated equatorial concentrations for K was about 410 mg/g.

== Internal structure ==
Diagram showing a possible internal structure of Ceres

Ceres's oblateness is consistent with a differentiated body, a rocky core overlain with an icy mantle.

This 100-kilometer-thick mantle (23%–28% of Ceres by mass; 50% by volume) contains up to 200 million cubic kilometers of water, which would be more than the amount of fresh water on Earth. Also, some characteristics of its surface and history (such as its distance from the Sun, which weakened solar radiation enough to allow some fairly low-freezing-point components to be incorporated during its formation), point to the presence of volatile materials in the interior of Ceres.

It has been suggested that a remnant layer of liquid water (or muddy ocean) may have survived to the present under a layer of ice. Measurements taken by Dawn confirm that Ceres is partially differentiated and has a shape in hydrostatic equilibrium, the smallest equilibrium body known. In 2020, researchers reported evidence suggesting Ceres has a brine reservoir beneath its surface, pointing to possible subsurface brine oceans.

Ceres has a rocky, dusty crust with large deposits of salts such as sodium carbonate and ammonium chloride.

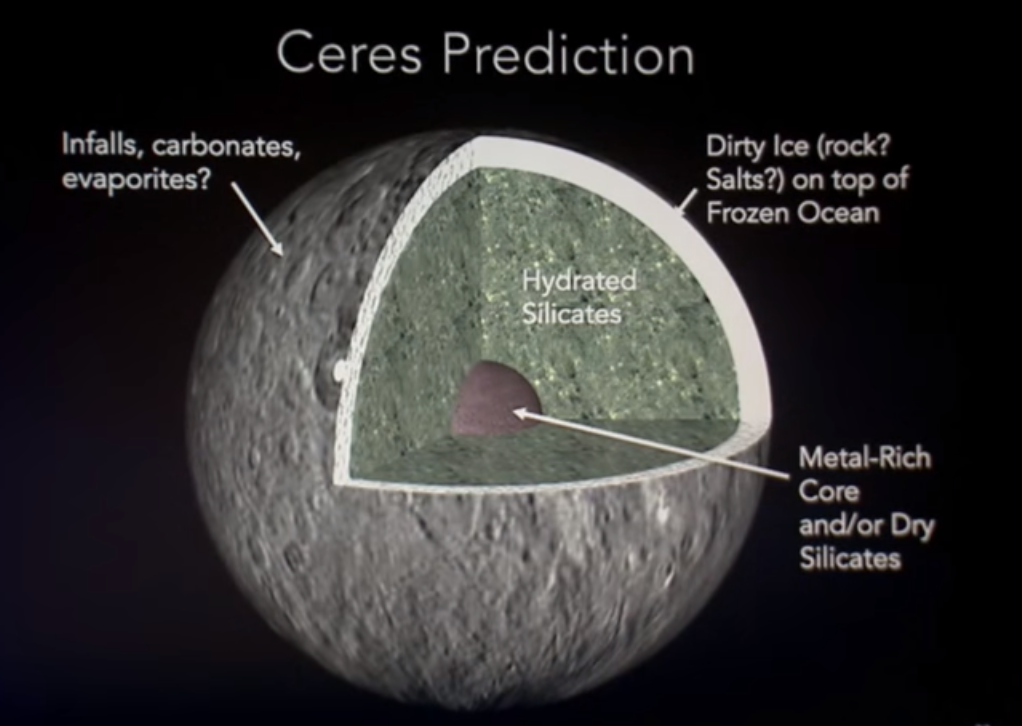
Internal structure of Ceres.

== Orientation ==
Ceres has an axial tilt of about 4°, a small part of its pole is currently not observable to Dawn. Ceres rotates once every 9 hours 4 minutes in a prograde west to east direction.

== Craters ==
Impact craters on Ceres exhibit a wide range of appearances. A large number of Cererian craters have central peaks. By correlating the presence or absence of central peaks with the sizes of the craters, scientists can infer the properties of Ceres's crust, such as how strong it is. Rather than a peak at the center, some craters contain large pits, depressions that may be a result of gases escaping after the impact.

The surface of Ceres has a large number of craters with low relief, indicating that they lie over a relatively soft surface, probably of water ice. Kerwan crater is extremely low relief, with a diameter of 283.88 kilometers, reminiscent of large, flat craters on Tethys and Iapetus. It is distinctly shallow for its size, and lacks a central peak, which may have been destroyed by a 15-kilometer-wide crater at the center. The crater is likely to be old relative to the rest of Ceres's surface, because it is overlapped by nearly every other feature in the area.

== Faculae ==
Several bright surface features were discovered on the dwarf planet Ceres by the Dawn spacecraft in 2015. The brightest spot is located in the middle of Occator crater, and is called "bright spot 5". There are 130 bright areas that have been discovered on Ceres, which are thought to be salt or ammonia-rich clays. Scientists reported that the bright spots on Ceres may be related to a type of salt in 2015, particularly a form of brine containing magnesium sulfate hexahydrate (MgSO_{4}·6H_{2}O); the spots were also found to be associated with ammonia-rich clays.

== Canyons ==
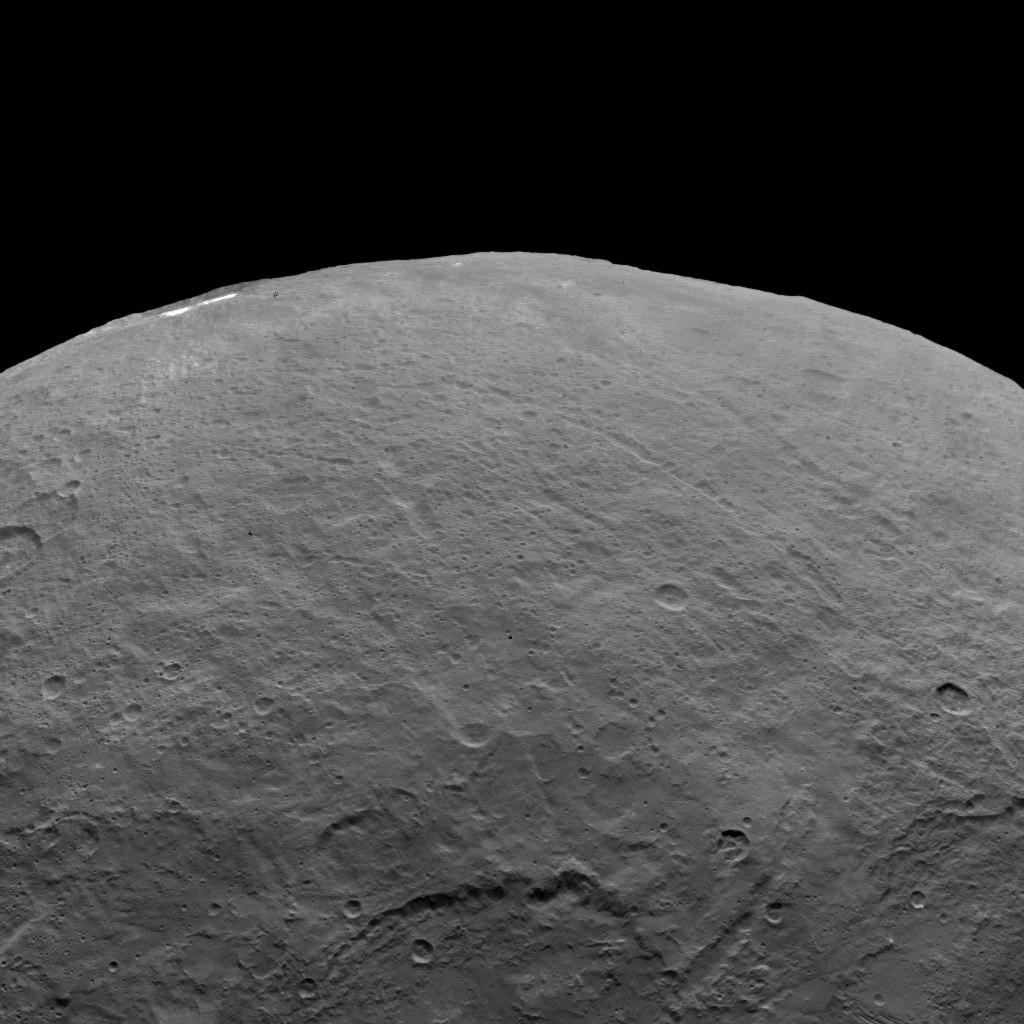
Several long canyons are evident in this view. The large crater that extends off the bottom of the picture is in the center of the picture above. Also notice the bright spots, just visible on the limb at upper left. The first picture above shows them from overhead.

Many long, straight or gently curved canyons have been found by Dawn. Geologists have yet to determine how they formed, and it is likely that several different mechanisms are responsible. Some of these might turn out to be the result of the crust of Ceres shrinking as the heat and other energy accumulated upon formation gradually radiated into space. When the behemoth slowly cooled, stresses could have fractured the rocky, icy ground. Others might have been produced when being struck by other objects, rupturing the terrain.

== Montes ==
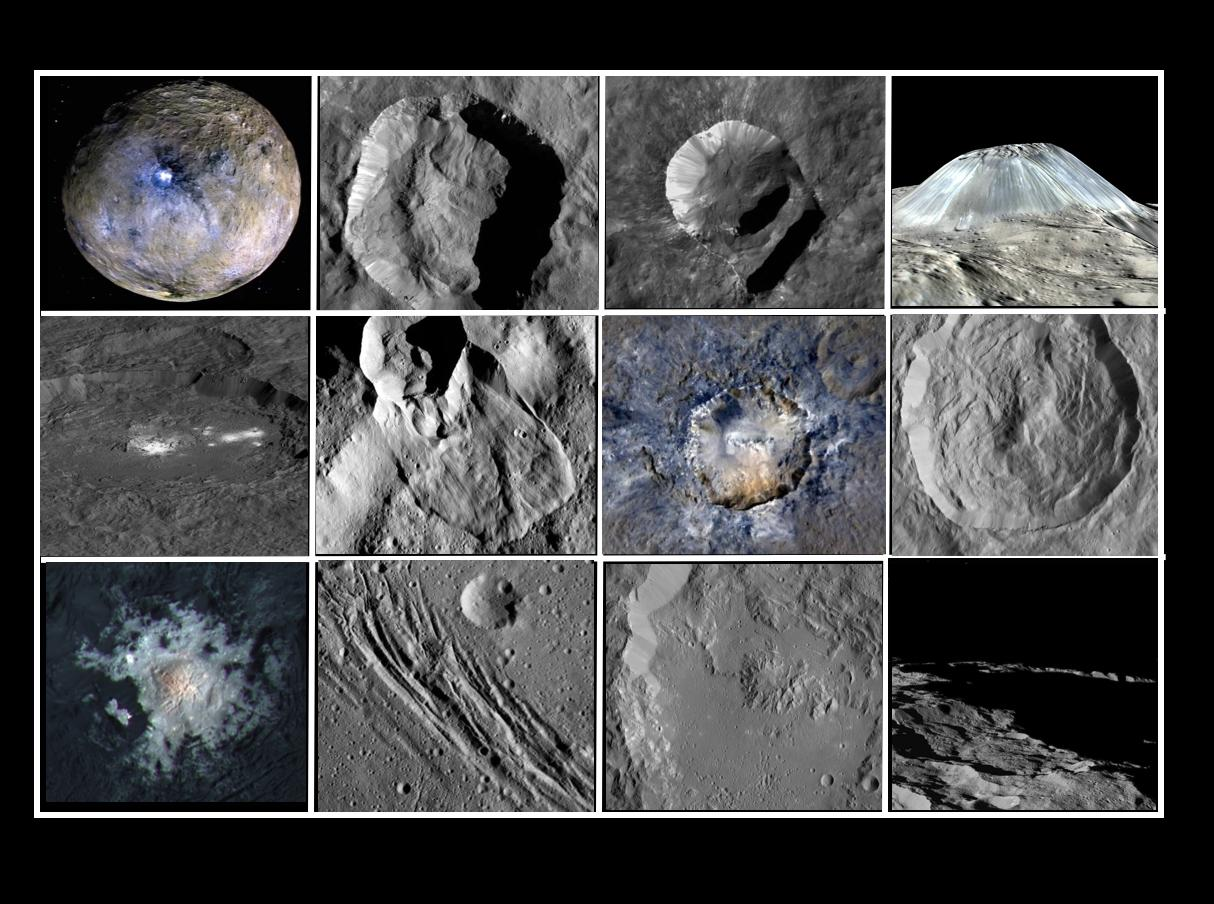
Notable geological features on Ceres

The most prominent mountain on Ceres is Ahuna Mons, a possible cryovolcanic dome about 6 kilometers high and 15 kilometers wide at the base. It was discovered on images taken by the Dawn spacecraft in orbit around Ceres in 2015.

Bright streaks run top to bottom on its slopes; these streaks are thought to contain salts, similar to the better known Cererian bright spots. The low crater count on Ahuna Mons's edifice suggests that the cryovolcano could be no older than 200 million years, and indeed models of plastic relaxation of ice at the latitude of Ahuna Mons are consistent with that age.

There are twenty-two identified montes on Ceres. Most of these have relaxed substantially over time, and it was only after modeling the expected shapes of old cryovolcanoes that they were identified. It has been calculated that Ceres averages one such cryovolcano every 50 million years. Yamor Mons (previously named Ysolo Mons), near the north pole, has a diameter of 16 km and is the only other Cererian mountain with the shape of Ahuna Mons, though old and battered, the cold temperatures at the pole have preserved its shape. Liberalia Mons is near the equator and has a diameter of 90 km.
