= Abellio (disambiguation) =

Abellio is a Celtic god.

Abellio may also refer to:

- Abellio (transport company), a bus and rail operator in Europe
  - Abellio Deutschland, in Germany
  - Abellio Surrey, a former bus operation in England
  - Transport UK London Bus, formerly Abellio London, a bus operator in London, England
- Raymond Abellio (1907–1986), French writer
- Abellio (crater), impact crater on the dwarf planet Ceres
