= Oxo (crater) =

Crater on Ceres

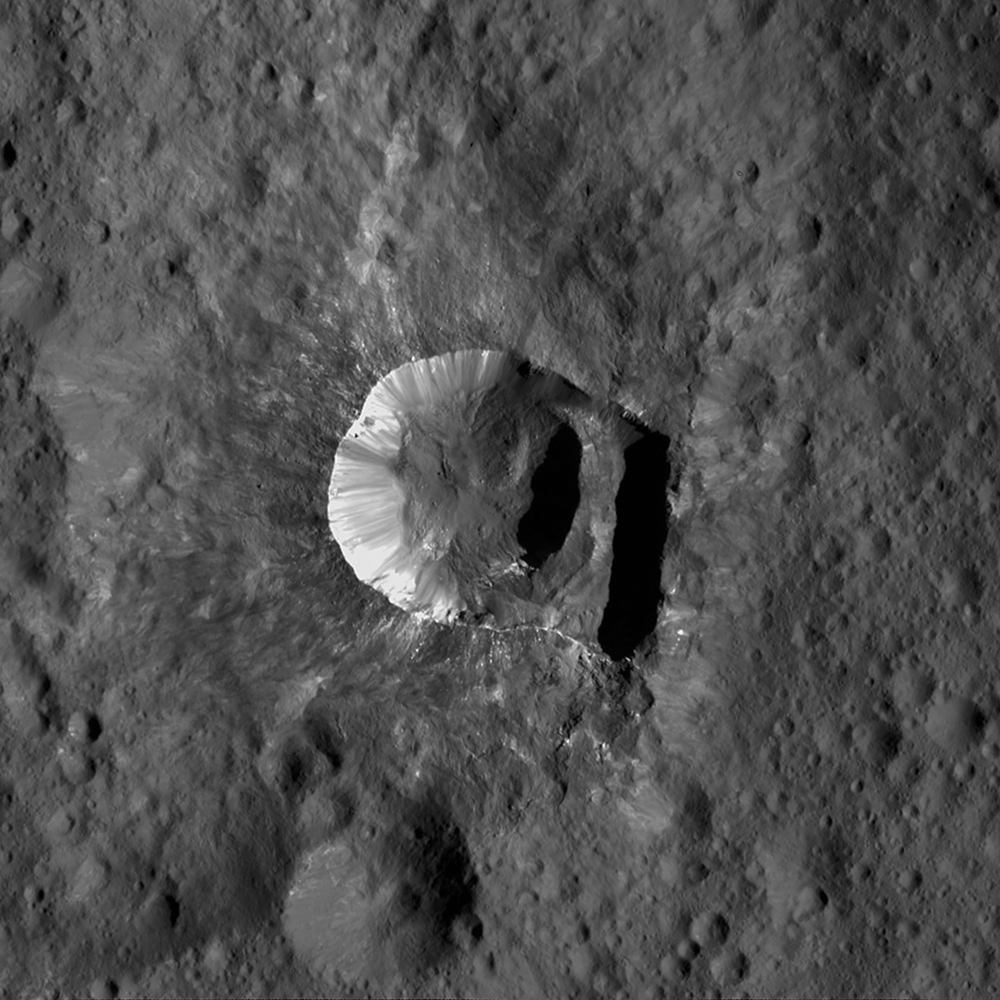
- Oxo imaged by Dawn from LAMO
- Feature type: Impact crater
- Location: Ceres
- Coordinates: 42.21°N 359.6°E
- Diameter: 10 kilometres (6.2 mi)
- Depth: 4,802 metres (15,755 ft)
- Discoverer: Dawn
- Eponym: After the Candomblé god of agriculture

Oxo /ˈɒʃoʊ/ is a small impact crater on the dwarf planet Ceres. Located in Ceres's northern hemisphere, it is the second-brightest feature on Ceres, after Haulani Crater. The crater was named after the Candomblé (and Yoruba) god of agriculture.

== Formation ==
Oxo is a very young crater, having been formed only 190+100
−70 ka (thousand years) ago, and it is entirely located within the older, heavily degraded crater Duginavi. Despite its relatively small size, the impact that created Oxo penetrated more deeply into Ceres than many larger craters, reaching a depth of 4,802 metres, and it excavated significant amounts of bright material that was distributed unevenly throughout the crater's ejecta blanket.

== Physical features ==
As a result of Oxo's young age it has a very sharp crater rim and a well-defined ejecta blanket. It is also home to many large boulders; boulders produced by older craters have largely been destroyed by micrometeoroid impacts.

Oxo is actively undergoing the sublimation of water ice, due to its young age. This ice is located along the crater's southern wall.

== See also ==
- List of geological features on Ceres
