= Occator =

Occator may refer to:

- Occator (mythology), an assistant-god of the Roman goddess Ceres
- Occator (crater), a crater on the planet Ceres, known for its bright spots
- Occator (bug), a treehopper in the subfamily Centrotinae
