= Dantu (crater) =

Impact crater on Ceres

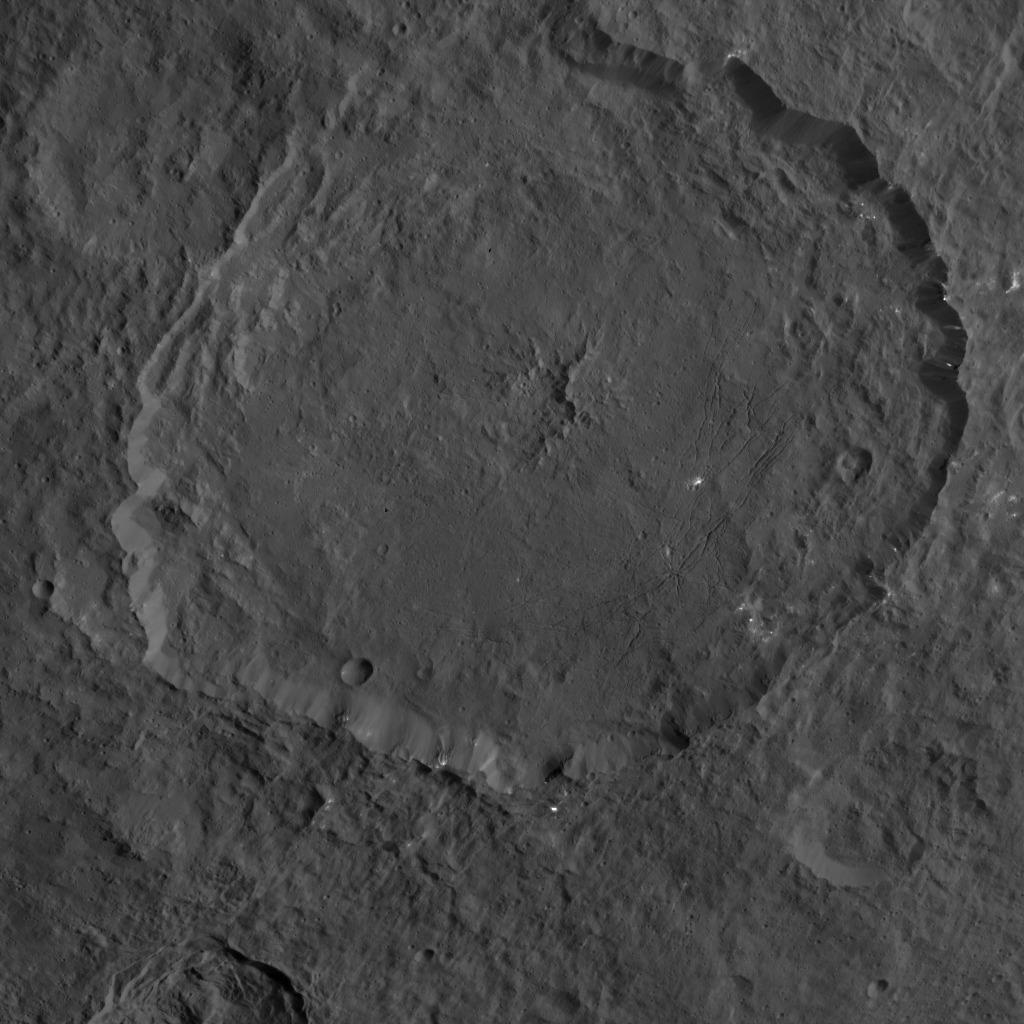
- Dantu crater.
- Feature type: Impact crater
- Location: Ceres
- Coordinates: 24.21°N 137.43°E
- Diameter: 124.62 kilometres (77.44 mi)
- Discoverer: Dawn
- Naming: Dantu, the Gã god of planting

Dantu /ˈdæntuː/ is a large crater on Ceres, located within the Vendimia Planitia. It is rimmed by a number of minor faculae, which together form Bright Spot 2. The crater is named after Dantu, the timekeeper and first god of planting (millet) of the Gã people of Accra, Ghana. Dantu is thought to have formed 230+30
−30 Ma (million years) ago, based on the amount of crater impacts present within its ejecta blankets.

The walls of Dantu are quite heavily eroded, with most of the north-eastern wall having collapsed completely. Due to Dantu's relatively young age, its crater floor is smooth, with few additional craters present within it. The crater floor also features a system of fractures, mostly located in the southern part of the crater. The center of Dantu is contains a peak, with a ring complex around it. The majority of Dantu's pit craters surround this feature, with said pit craters largely ranging between 400 and 900 metres in diameter.
