= Abellio (crater) =

Ceres Crater

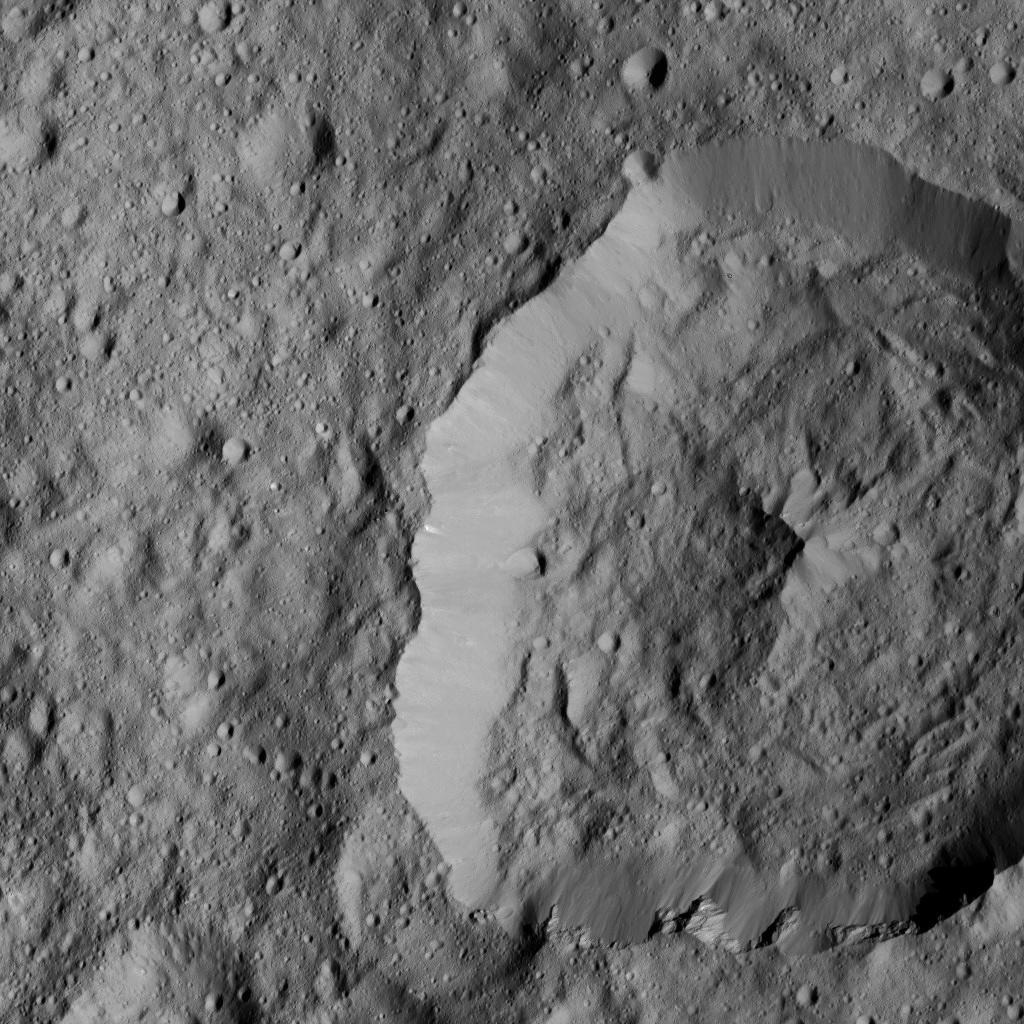
- An image of Abellio and its surrounding area. It is the crater to the bottom right.
- Feature type: Crater
- Location: Fejokoo Quadrangle, Ceres
- Coordinates: 33.20°N 66.91°W
- Diameter: ~32km
- Discoverer: Dawn spacecraft team 2015
- Eponym: Abellio, god of the apple tree in Gaul.

Abellio is a crater on the surface of the dwarf planet and large asteroid Ceres. It is a corner of the Fejokoo Quadrangle, located northwest of the namesake crater. It is named after the Gaul agricultural deity of apple trees much like other craters on Ceres. Its name was officiated on December 4, 2015 by the International Astronomical Union.

Through the use of Lunar-Derived Absolute Model, it was determined that Abellio is less than 80 million years old. It is made up of primarily magnesium and calcium carbonate with the crater having an above average number of carbonates.

== See also ==
- List of geological features on Ceres
- Geology of Ceres
- List of craters on minor planets
