= Victa (disambiguation) =

Victa is an Australian gardening equipment manufacturer.

Victa may also refer to:

- Victa Cinema, heritage-listed cinema in South Australia
- Victa Aircruiser, Australian four-seat aircraft
- Victa R-2, Australian prototype four-seat aircraft
- Victa Airtourer, Australian touring aircraft
- Tata Sumo Victa, facelift version of the Tata Sumo Spacio
- Victa (crater), an impact crater on the dwarf planet Ceres
