= Region A =

Region A may refer to:

- Region A of the IALA Maritime Buoyage System
- Region A of the Blu-ray disc storage system
- Occator Crater on Ceres, known as "Region A" from ground-based images from the Keck Observatory.
