= Consus (crater) =

Impact crater on Ceres

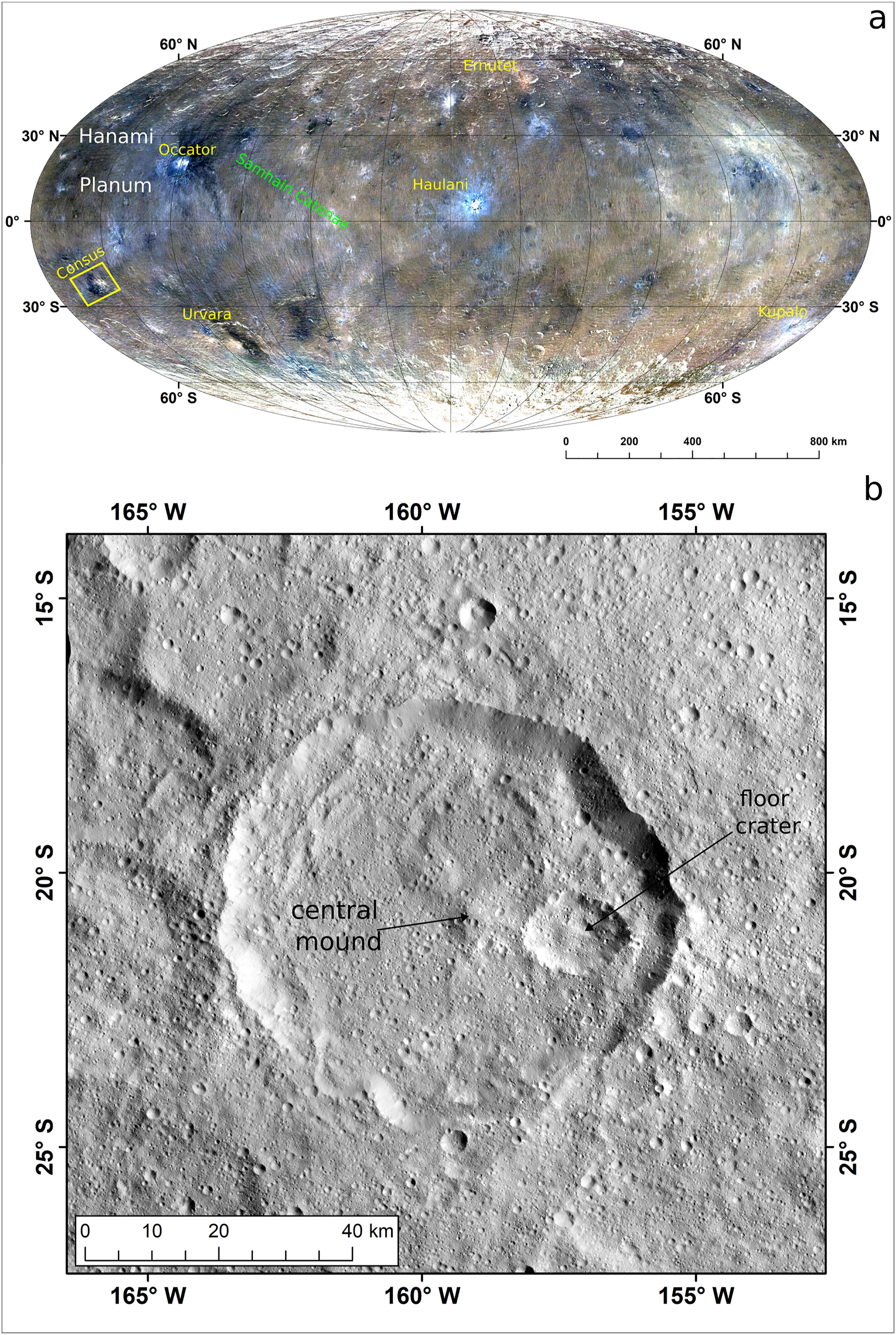
- A map of Consus and its location on Ceres
- Feature type: Complex crater
- Location: Ceres
- Coordinates: 20.70°S 200.50°E
- Diameter: 64 km
- Depth: 4 km
- Eponym: Consus

Consus is an impact crater on Ceres, a dwarf planet in the asteroid belt. About 64 kilometres (40 mi) in diameter and 4 kilometres (2.5 mi) deep, it hosts a degraded central mound and a heavily cratered floor. Its floor hosts a variety of terrain units, several of which have been excavated by mass wasting processes and impact events. It is named after Consus, a Roman god who protected harvested and stored crop. The name was adopted by the International Astronomical Union (IAU) on 25 March 2016.

== Geology ==
Consus is an old, degraded complex crater with a diameter of 64 kilometres (40 mi). It is located within cratered terrain southwest of the broad plateau Hanami Planum. Its crater rim is well defined and continuous, rising about 4.5 kilometres (2.8 mi) above the crater floor, though the inner portions of the wall show post-impact slumping and degraded terraces in the northwest. The crater hosts an eroded central mound 5 kilometres (3.1 mi) in diameter and 1 kilometre (0.62 mi) tall, with patches of bright material smaller than 300 metres (980 ft). The crater floor is hummocky in texture, and several protruding knobs in the northeastern floor could represent the remnants of a central peak. Adjacent to the central mound is a small, elongated impact crater 11 by 15 kilometres (6.8 mi × 9.3 mi) in size that occupies much of Consus's eastern floor. On the floor crater's eastern rim, a smaller 200 metres (660 ft) crater has excavated bright material with a reflectivity comparable to salt lenses found within the central ridge of Urvara and Vinalia Faculae within Occator. A north–south trending linear feature is located near Consus's southern rim, potentially representing a thrust fault or the flow front of a landslide debris lobe.

Consus's ejecta field is poorly defined, with no obvious brightness, color, or topographical variation delineating its extent. No significant age difference exists between areas bordering Consus and the surrounding cratered terrain, indicating that the ejecta field is largely destroyed. Estimating the remnants of the ejecta field using the crater counting method yields an age of 450±100 million years (Myr) old; Consus's floor has a similar crater size-frequency distribution to the remnant ejecta field, suggesting that it is of a similar age. The eastern floor crater, meanwhile, has a derived age of 280±60 Myr old, significantly younger than Consus.

Consus shows a larger color diversity than other Cerean craters of a similar size and age. Most of the crater is dominated by terrain with a similar color to the Cerean global average, with a higher reflectance overall in the south and southeast. Bright material mostly occurs in small patches, including the small 0.2 km crater, indicating that it was recently exposed by mass wasting or impact events. Material of intermediate brightness is found in several other small floor craters, a portion of Consus's southeastern wall, and in the western ejecta field. Dark blue material is mostly located on the southeastern floor, southeastern inner wall, and the southeastern ejecta field. Meanwhile, dark reddish material is found only in a few small areas. Consus's crater floor appears to exhibit various minerals, including ammonia-bearing phyllosilicates and sodium carbonate deposits.
