= Haulani (crater) =

Crater on Ceres

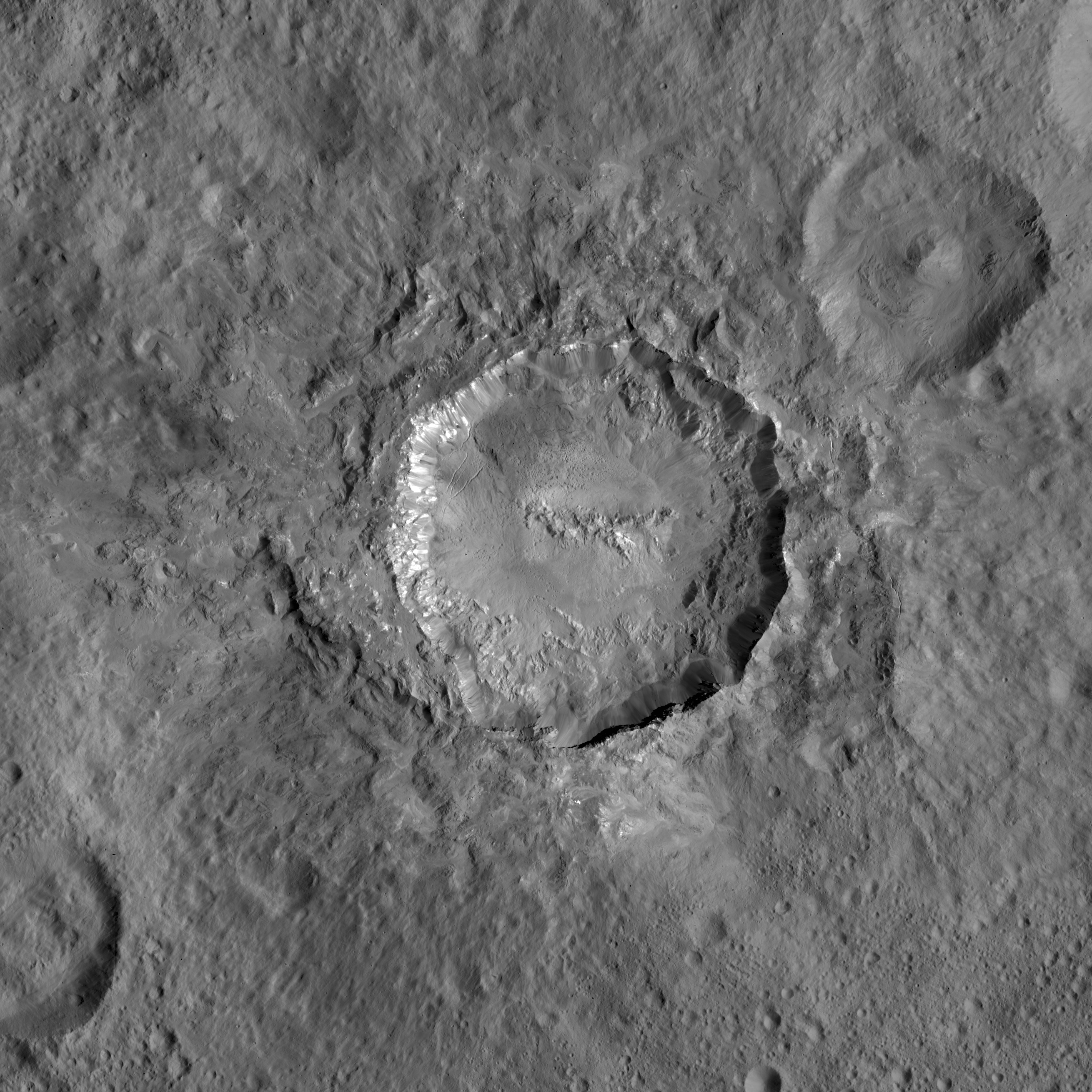
- Haulani imaged by Dawn from LAMO
- Feature type: Central-peak impact crater
- Location: Ceres
- Coordinates: 5.34°N 10.58°E
- Diameter: 34 kilometres (21 mi)
- Discoverer: Dawn
- Eponym: Haulani, Hawaiian goddess of plants

Haulani /haʊˈlɑːni/ is an impact crater located on the dwarf planet Ceres that contains "Spot 1", one of the bright spots observed by the Dawn spacecraft. The crater was named after Haulani, the Hawaiian goddess of plants. In July 2018, NASA released a comparison of physical features, including Haulani crater, found on Ceres with similar ones present on Earth.

== Geology ==
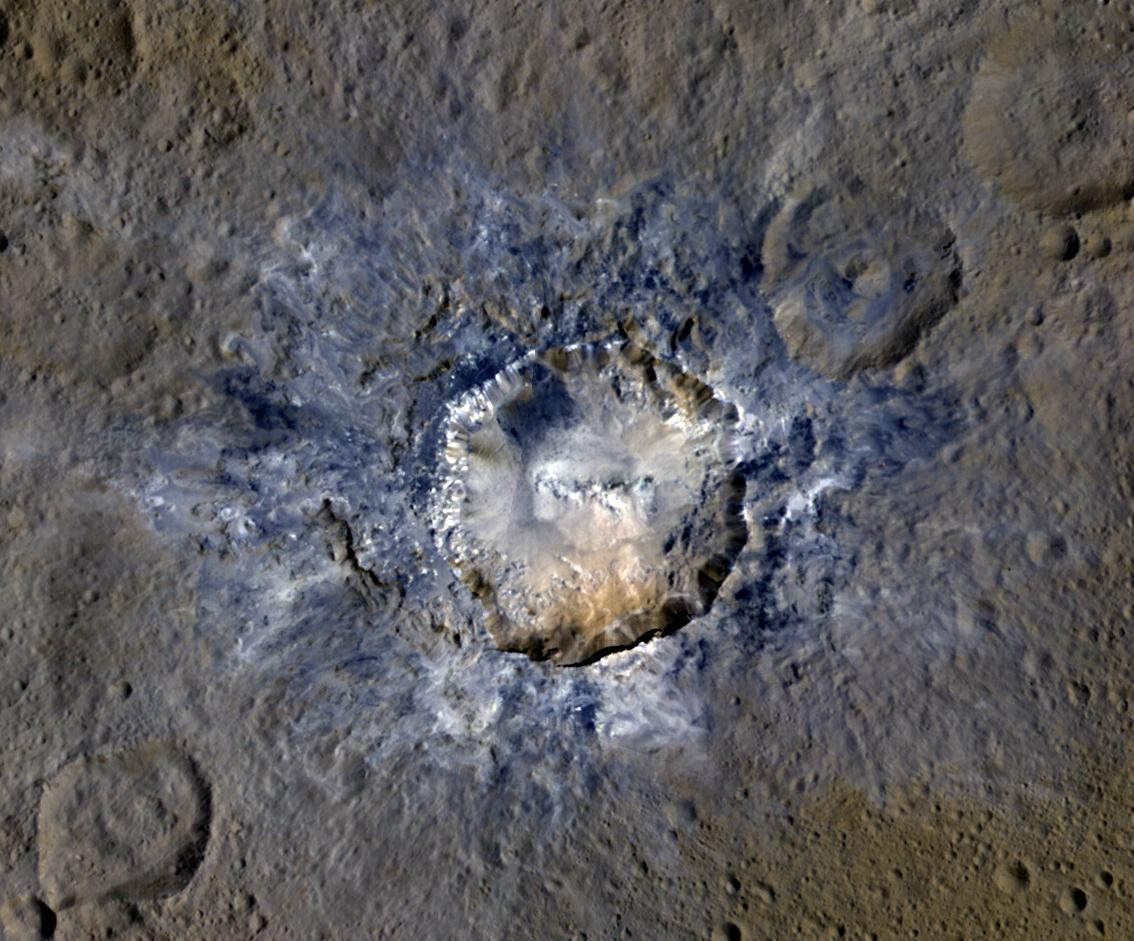
Haulani in enhanced color

Haulani is located near the western edge of a plateau, with two small dome-shaped mountains—Dalien Tholus and an unnamed mountain—bordering the crater to the west. Haulani is surrounded by an extensive bright ejecta blanket that extends preferentially westward, with crater rays extending up to 490 kilometres (300 miles) from Haulani's center. Structurally, Haulani's floor is dominated by a smooth plain, with the floor interrupted by cracks and pit chains to the northwest. An east-west oriented mountainous ridge roughly 21.8 kilometres (13.5 mi) long and up to 300 metres (980 ft) high occupies Haulani's center. As with many craters on Ceres, Haulani has been extensively modified by mass wasting processes, with landslide deposits from the crater rim covering parts of its floor. It is one of the youngest large craters on Ceres, estimated to have been formed between 1.7 and 5.9 million years ago. As a result, it is one of Ceres's brightest surface features.

== See also ==
- List of geological features on Ceres
