= Kerwan (crater) =

Largest impact crater on Ceres

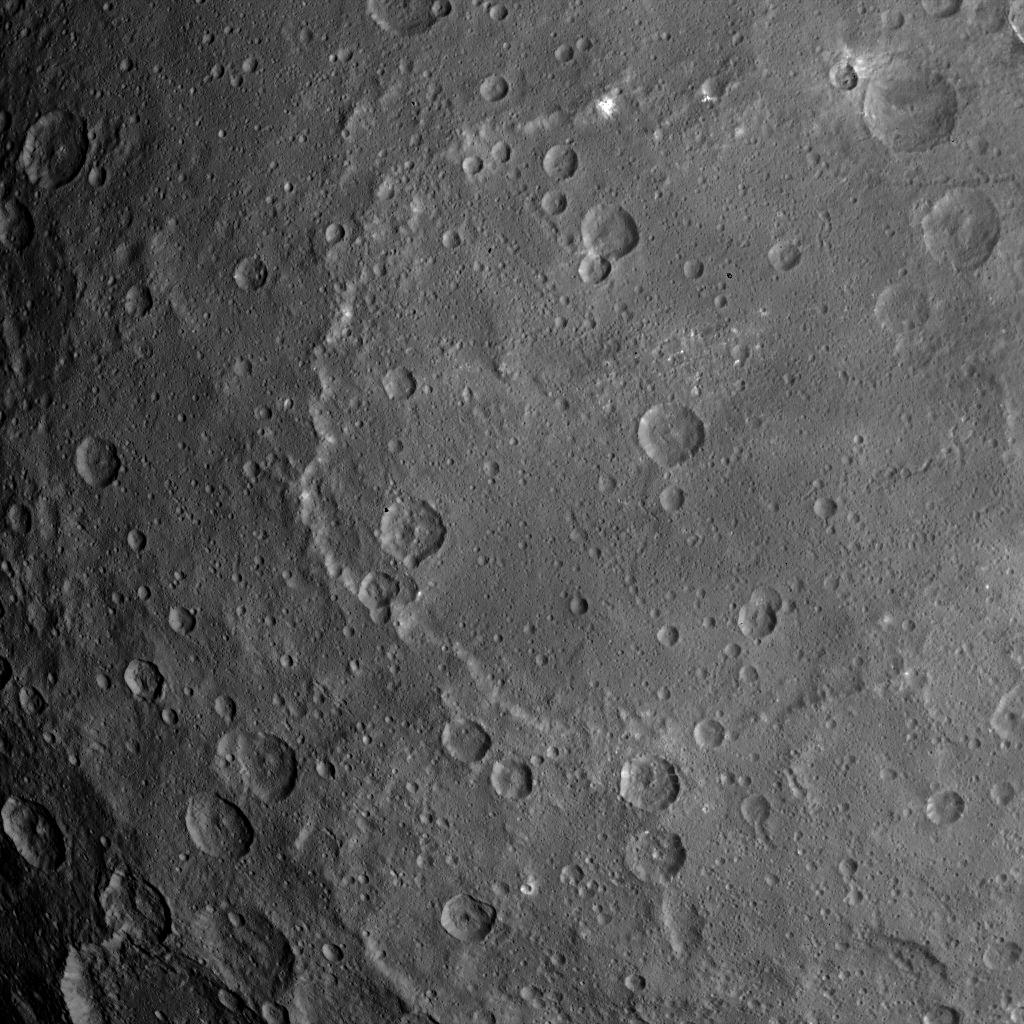
- Kerwan crater. North is to the right.
- Feature type: Crater
- Location: Ceres
- Coordinates: 11.47°S 122.58°E
- Diameter: 283.88 km
- Depth: ~5 km
- Discoverer: Dawn
- Eponym: Kerwan, Hopi spirit of the sprouting maize

Kerwan (/ˈkɜːrwən/) is the largest confirmed impact basin and one of the largest geological features on the dwarf planet Ceres. It was discovered on February 19, 2015 from Dawn images as it approached Ceres. The crater is distinctly shallow for its size, and lacks a central peak. A central peak might have been destroyed by a 15-kilometer-wide crater at the center of Kerwan. The crater is likely to be young relative to the rest of Ceres's surface, as Kerwan has largely obliterated the cratering in the southern part of Vendimia Planitia.

Kerwan is roughly antipodal to Ahuna Mons, the largest, or at least youngest, mountain on Ceres. Seismic energy from the Kerwan-forming impact may have focused on the opposite side of Ceres, fracturing the outer layers of the crust and facilitating the movement of high-viscosity cryomagma (consisting of muddy water ice softened by its content of salts) onto the surface. Kerwan too shows evidence of the effects of liquid water due to impact-melting of subsurface ice.

The crater is named after the Hopi spirit of sprouting maize, Kerwan. The name was approved by the IAU on July 3, 2015.

== See also ==
- List of geological features on Ceres
