= Victa (crater) =

Impact crater on Ceres

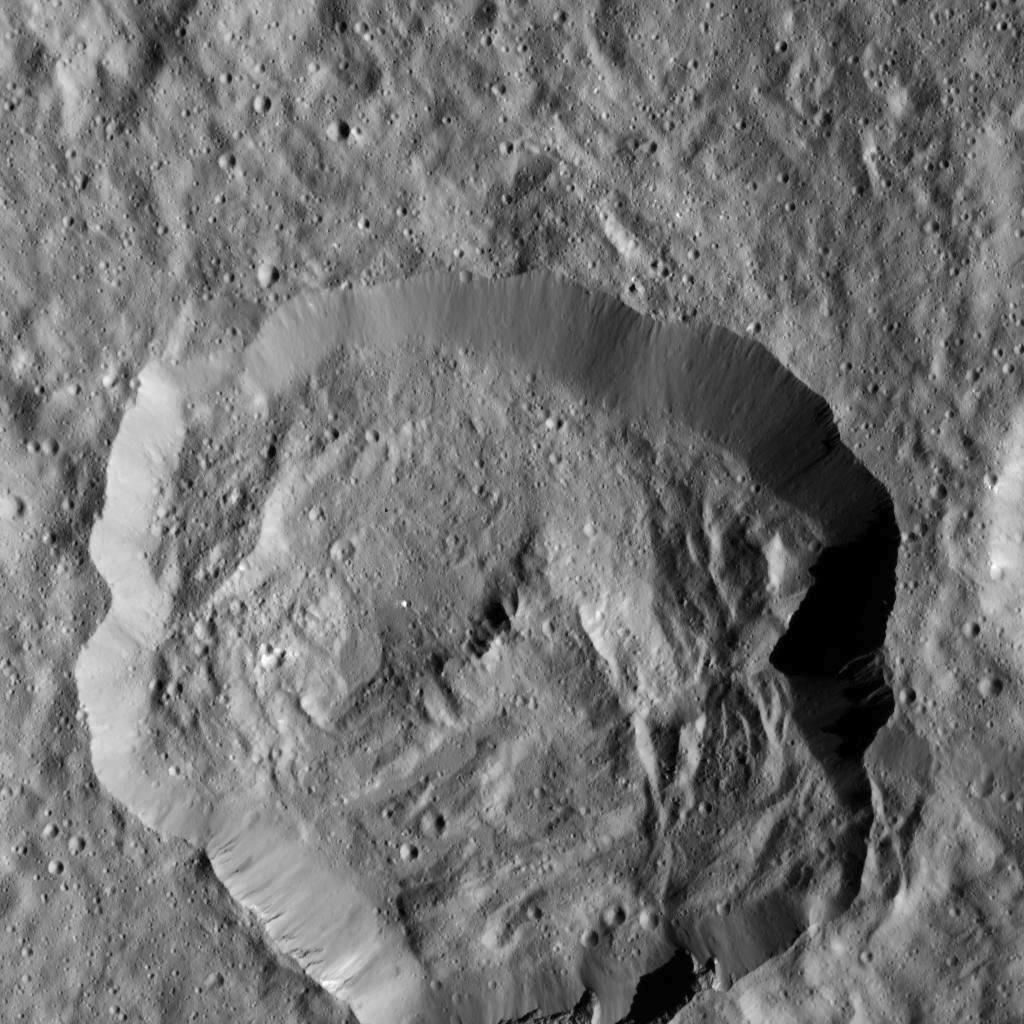
- Victa, as imaged by Dawn on 19 December 2015
- Feature type: Central-peak impact crater
- Location: Ceres
- Coordinates: 36.23°N 58.96°W
- Diameter: 32 km
- Discoverer: Dawn
- Eponym: Victa

Victa is an impact crater on Ceres, a dwarf planet in the asteroid belt. It is roughly 32 kilometres (20 mi) in diameter, nearly the same size as the neighboring crater Abellio to its west. It was named after Victa, the Roman goddess of food and nourishment. Its name was adopted by the International Astronomical Union (IAU) on 21 September 2015.

Victa is located in the central region of the Fejokoo quadrangle. The region lies 2 kilometres (1.2 mi) below the average elevation of Ceres, and it represents the northernmost extension of a vast depression that dominates the Rongo quadrangle. Victa and Abellio share compositional and structural similarities; Victa has a steep crater wall, with ridges and terraces on its crater floor and signs of mass wasting processes. A small depression interrupts its southern rim, likely the remnants of a pre-existing impact crater. Compared to Abellio, Victa's crater floor is flatter since it formed entirely within the topographic depression, and its concentric terraces are much more irregularly spaced. Both craters are ancient and have darker surfaces compared to the rest of the Fejokoo quadrangle, though Victa is slightly brighter than Abellio. Victa's surface spectrum suggests that its ground composition is similar to the average global composition of Ceres, though it is slightly depleted in hydroxide-bearing phyllosilicate minerals.
