= Erntedankfest Düsseldorf-Urdenbach =

Annual celebration in Germany

The Erntedankfest (English literal translation: "harvest thanks festival" idiomatically: Thanksgiving) in Düsseldorf-Urdenbach is an annual traditional celebration, incorporating most parts of this borough and attracting thousands of tourists to thank God for the gifts of harvest. With a history of 90 years and about 40 participating groups it marks one of the biggest and most important Erntedankfest celebrations in the Rheinland. It includes church services, huge parades and music in a traditional fair atmosphere.

== History ==
The Erntedankfest is an important part of Urdenbach's tradition and marks one of the most important events in the south of Düsseldorf and the Rheinland.

Compared to the analogous Thanksgiving holidays seen in the United States and Canada, German Erntedankfest is not a recognized state holiday and is celebrated on a smaller scale, most commonly in rural farm communities and in churches. In the early 1900s, Düsseldorf-Urdenbach was characterized by its agriculture and nature reserves. During that time the Erntedankfest was celebrated by actual farmers to thank God for the harvest. Later, when most of the farmers turned away from their initial business and Germany experienced widespread upheaval in the early 20th century, the remaining farmers were not able to continue this tradition on their own. In the 1950s, the ABVU (Allgemeiner Bürgerverein Urdenbachs / engl.: "general citizens association of Urdenbach") overtook the management of the Erntedankfest and is still responsible for its execution. Nowadays most of the participating groups do not have an actual farming background, but a common interest for the traditions of Urdenbach.

== Order of events ==
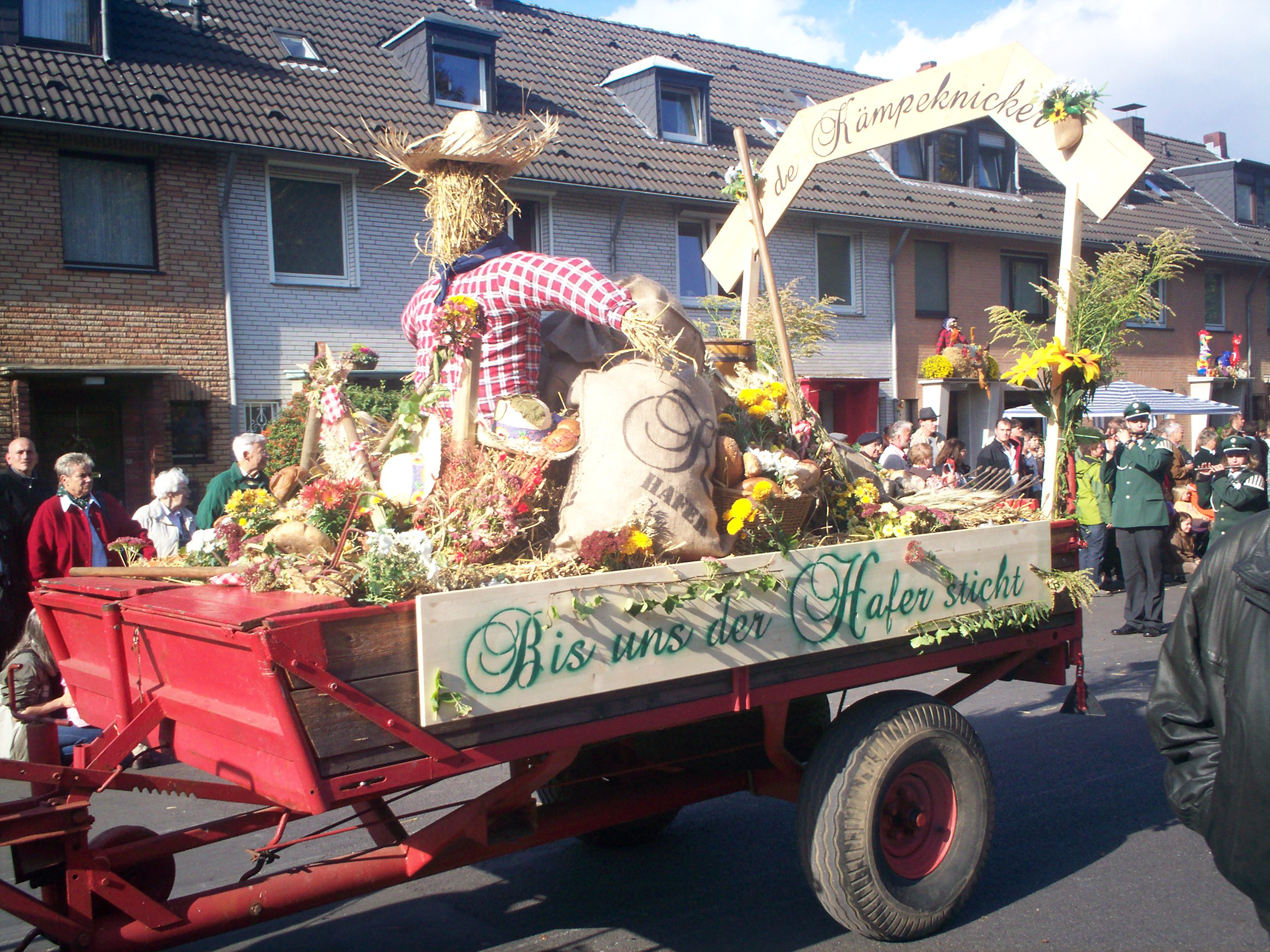
A traditionally decorated trailer during the Erntedank parade

The Erntedankfest parade always takes place the first Sunday after each year's September 29, the Michaelistag (engl.: Michaelmas). The Erntedankfest celebration lasts from Friday to Monday. The sequence of events and their schedule is almost the same every year.

The starting point is the mass in one of the churches in Urdenbach on Friday evening.

On Saturday most of the groups finalize their preparations during the day for the parade on Sunday. In the evening, people of Urdenbach come together in a big party tent at Piel's Loch (the local fairground) with a special evening's entertainment. Usually entertainment is provided by a DJ and a live band.

On Sunday usually at 11am a concert takes places at Piel's Loch while people can have a traditional dish: oaf on a spit.

At 1pm the Erntedankfest groups gather to get ready for the Erntedank parade through Urdenbach, which starts at 2pm and marks the highlight of the weekend. About 40 groups present their individual contributions to the Erntedankfest in form of traditionally decorated tractors and trailers, typical farmers' tools and the traditional costumes worn by the group members. Up to 40.000 visitors line the streets of Urdenbach to get a glimpse of the parade.

Right after the parade the "Schürreskarrenrennen" (engl.: traditional wheelbarrow race) takes place. Members of different groups try to finish a fixed distance first with their traditionally decorated wheelbarrows and wearing the traditional costumes, including bulky clogs. The winner of the race is announced in the party tent later.

In late afternoon, citizens of Urdenbach and guests celebrate together at places all over the borough, in the party tent, pubs, and at numerous beer stalls.

On Monday the "Blotschenball" (engl.: "clogs ball") takes place, where the new Blotschenkönigspaar (engl.: "royal clogs couple") is announced.

During the weekend there are funfair rides and snack stalls at the fairground at Piel's Loch.

== Erntedankfest groups ==
Some of the Erntedankfest groups and their websites:

- De Kämpeknicker
- De Kümmerlinge
- Grupp mem Heaetz
- Kämpenflitzer
- Heckedrisser

== See also ==
- Oktoberfest
