= List of Zapotec deities =

The Zapotec culture is polytheist. Notable deities include:

- Cocijo, god of rain
- Coquihani, god of light
- Cozobi, god of maize
- Huetexi Pea, god who measured the world
- Cozaana, god who created animals and fish, god of the hunt, creator deity and consort of Huichaana
- Huichaana, goddess who created men and fish, goddess of procreation and children, creator deity and consort of Cozaana
- Copiycha, god of the sun
- Pezeelao (also rendered Bezelao), god of death and the underworld.
- Xoo, god of earthquakes
- Peeze, god of omens
- Paa, god of merchants, wealth, good fortune, and happiness
- Ziy, god of misery and misfortune
- Xicala, god of dreams
- Pecala, god of love and lechery

== See also ==
- Zapotec civilization
