= Tibong (crater) =

Impact crater on Ceres

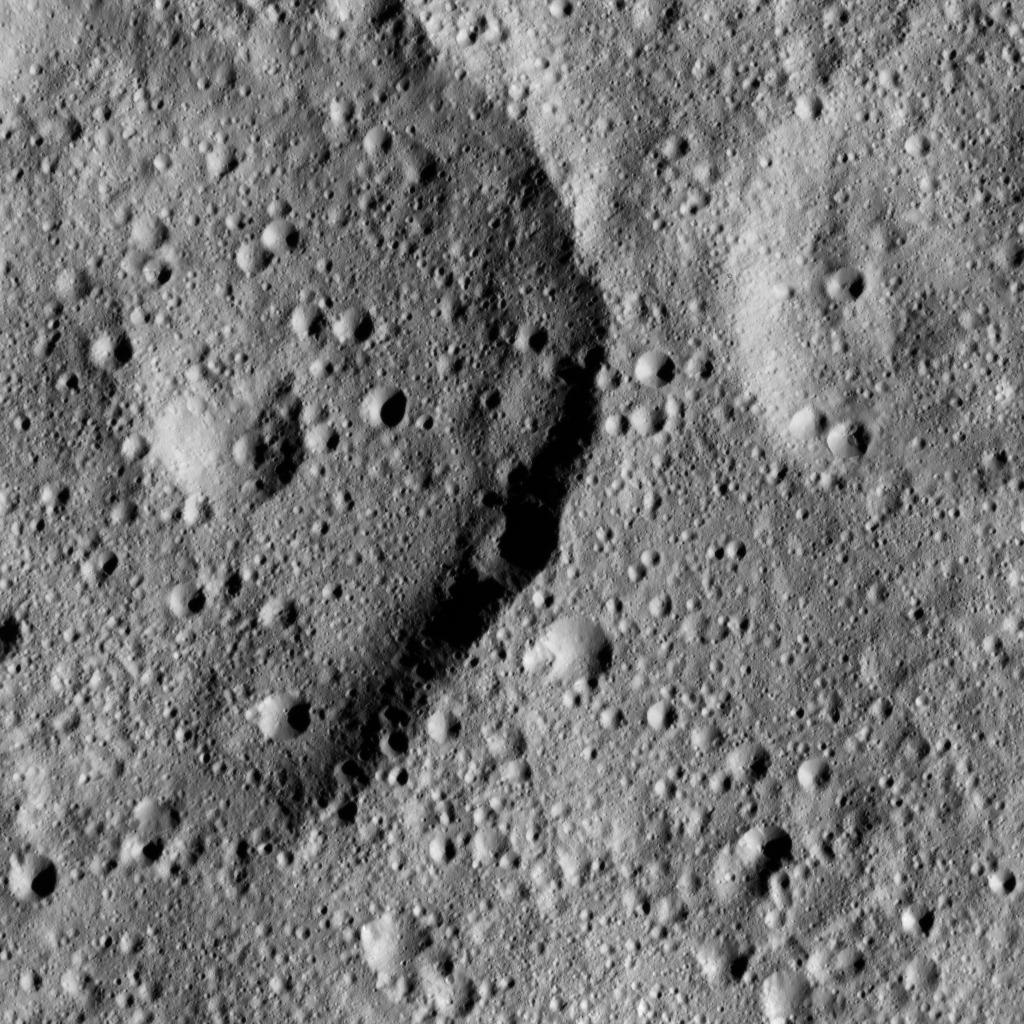
- Dawn photo showing Tibong crater
- Feature type: Impact crater
- Location: Ceres
- Coordinates: 29°49′S 352°12′E
- Diameter: 36 km (22 mi)
- Discoverer: Dawn mission
- Naming: 15 October 2015
- Eponym: Tibong, in Indonesian mythology

Tibong is an impact crater on Ceres, a dwarf planet. The crater was named after the Tibong, the eponymous malevolent spirit who, according to Indonesian mythology from the Land Dayak people located in Borneo and Kalimantan, devours and depletes rice crops. The name "Tibong" was officially approved by the International Astronomical Union (IAU) on 15 October 2015.

== Geology and characteristics ==
Located on the Yalode quadrangle at 29°48′S 352°12′E, the crater has a diameter of approximately 36 kilometres (22 mi).. The area around the Tibong crater has a high density of other impact craters.
