= Bon Dalien =

Cambodian harvest festival celebration

Bon Dalien is a harvest festival ritual and celebration in Cambodia.

Dalien Tholus on Mars in named after this festival.

== See also ==
- Som Toeuk Plieng
