= Ikapati (crater) =

Impact crater on Ceres

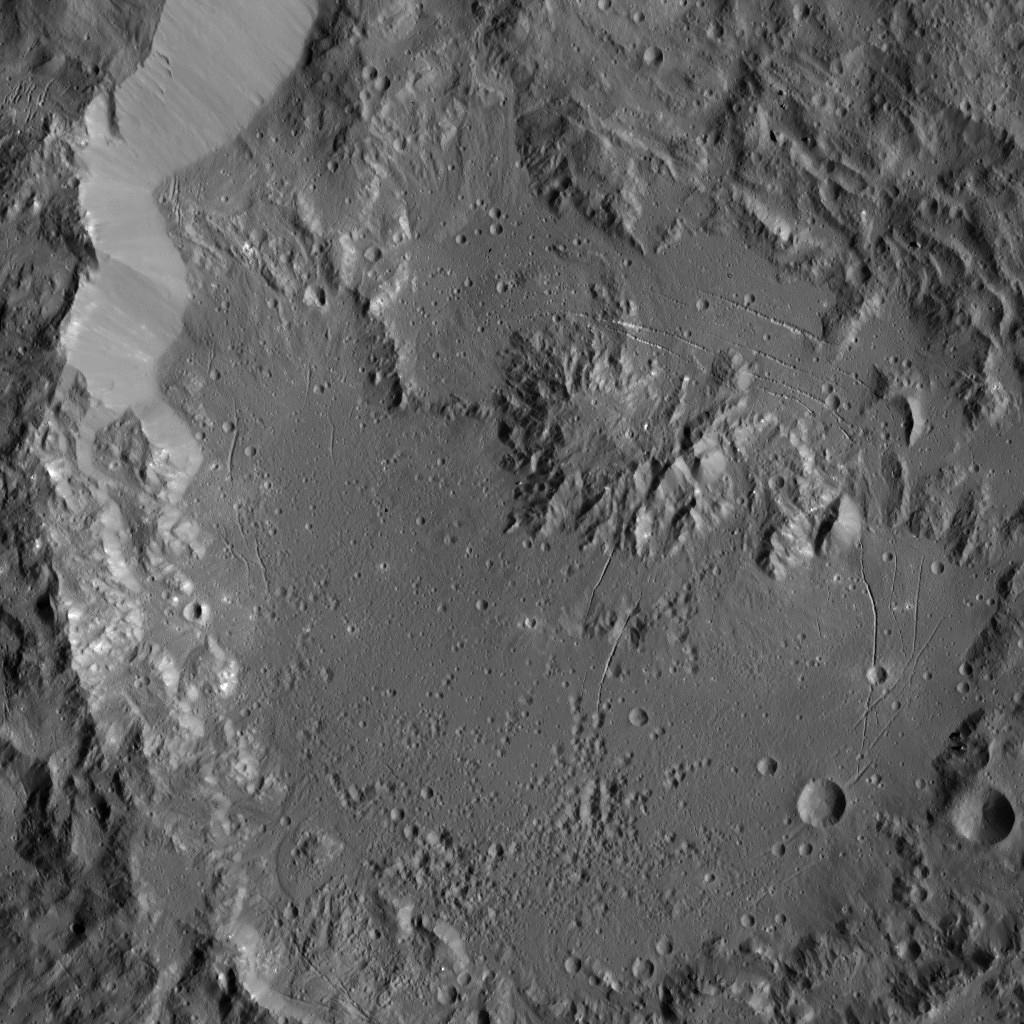
- Ikapati, imaged by the Dawn orbiter on 24 January 2016
- Feature type: Central-peak crater
- Location: Ceres
- Coordinates: 33.84°N 45.61°E
- Diameter: 50 km
- Depth: 2.8 km
- Discoverer: Dawn
- Eponym: Ikapati

Ikapati is a large impact crater on Ceres, a dwarf planet located in the main asteroid belt. A central-peak crater, it is 50 kilometres (31 mi) in diameter and 2.8 kilometres (1.7 mi) deep. Its crater floor and rim are lower in the southwest, and large portions of the floor are covered in plains of very smooth terrain. Fractures, bright spots, and pits within the crater suggest that post-impact intrusive activity took place, modifying the crater's structure. The crater is named after Ikapati, the Philippine goddess of cultivated land. The name was adopted by the International Astronomical Union (IAU) on 21 September 2015.

== Geology ==
Ikapati is a central-peak crater about 50 kilometres (31 mi) in diameter and 2.8 kilometres (1.7 mi) deep. It is located in the Coniraya quadrangle and formed on the northeastern border of a preexisting topographic depression. The southwestern part of the crater overlaps with the depression, resulting in the southwestern crater rim lying about 5 kilometres (3.1 mi) lower than the northeastern rim. The highest point on the northeastern rim rises 5.7 kilometres (3.5 mi) above the southeastern crater floor, whilst the southwestern rim rises only 1 kilometre (0.62 mi) above the floor. The crater wall is highly terraced in the northeast, but sparsely terraced in the southwest. Portions of the floor and central peak complex are covered in bright spots, termed faculae, suggesting that post-impact upwelling or outgassing took place. The floor is also covered by fractures oriented both orthogonally and parallel to the central structure, which formed as the floor domed upward from a subsurface intrusion. Pits occupy the floor and four topographic depressions to the crater's southwest. The pits are 100–800 metres (330–2,620 ft) in diameter and tens of meters deep with somewhat circular to irregular shapes.

Large parts of Ikapati's floor and surrounding terrain is covered by very smooth terrain. Within the crater, most smooth terrain is located at the lower southwestern floor. "Ponds" of smooth material range in size from 2 to 1,065 square kilometres (0.77 to 411.20 mi^{2}), and some ponds are connected by channel-like rilles. Some rilles are partly filled by the smooth material and terminate at fan-shaped deposits, suggesting the downslope movement of material. The ponds resemble pools of impact melt found in other impact craters in the Solar System, such as Tycho on Earth's Moon. However, the lower impact velocities on Ceres should not produce high volumes of impact melt, making it an unlikely formation mechanism for Ikapati's smooth ponds. Water ice's presence at the impact location could have fluidized impact ejecta, forming the smooth ponds. Similarities in the texture of the smooth ponds and the terrain between individual pits suggest that both features may have a common origin.
