= Ahuna Mons =

Largest mountain on Ceres

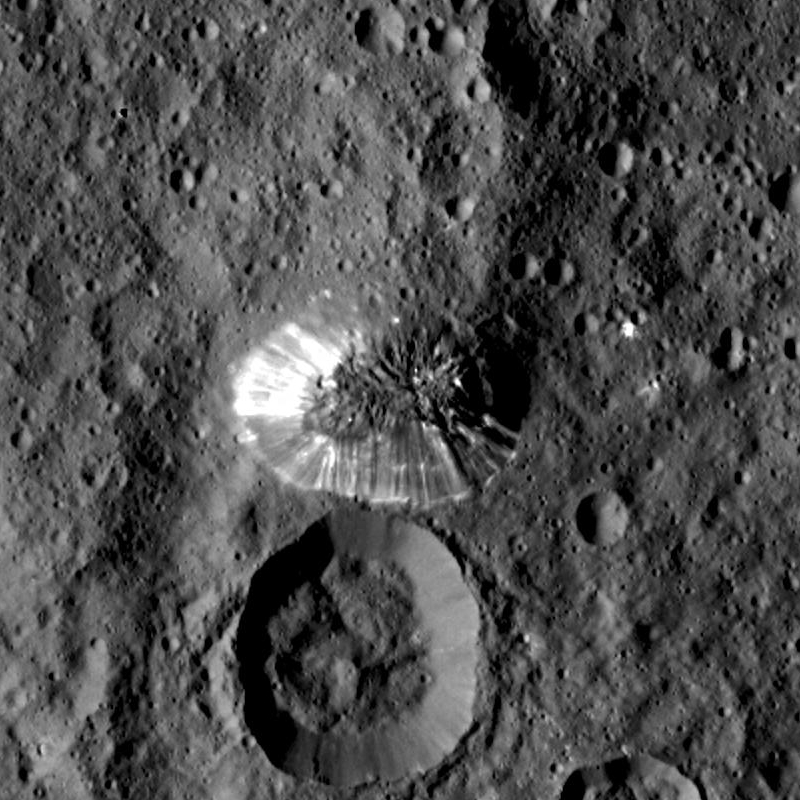
- Ahuna Mons imaged by the Dawn spacecraft. (Note: North is down.)
- Feature type: Cryovolcanic dome
- Location: Ceres
- Coordinates: 10.46°S 315.8°E
- Peak: 4.1 km (2.5 mi) 13,500 ft (4,100 m)
- Discoverer: Dawn spacecraft team 2015
- Eponym: Ahuna, harvest festival of the Sümi Naga people.

Ahuna Mons (/əˈhuːnə ˈmɒnz/) is the largest mountain on the dwarf planet and asteroid Ceres. It protrudes above the cratered terrain, is not an impact feature, and is the only mountain of its kind on Ceres. Bright streaks run top to bottom on its slopes which are thought to consist of ammoniated compounds, sodium carbonate and magnesium-calcium carbonate similar to the better known Cererian bright spots, and likely resulted from cryovolcanic activity from Ceres's interior. It is named after the traditional post-harvest festival Ahuna of the Sümi Naga people of India. In July 2018, NASA released a comparison of physical features, including Ahuna Mons, found on Ceres with similar ones present on Earth.

== Discovery ==
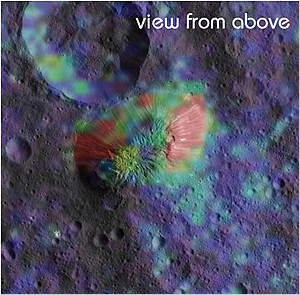
Significant amounts of sodium carbonate (represented by green and red coloring) have been detected on Ahuna Mons.

The mountain was discovered on images taken by the Dawn spacecraft in orbit around Ceres in 2015. It is estimated to have an average height of about 4 km (2.5 mi; 13,000 ft) and a maximum height of about 5 km (3.1 mi; 16,000 ft) on its steepest side; it is about 20 km (12 mi; 66,000 ft) wide at the base.

== Origin ==
It has been proposed that Ahuna Mons formed as a cryovolcanic dome. It is the closest cryovolcano to the Sun yet discovered. It is roughly antipodal to the largest impact basin on Ceres, 280 km (170 mi) diameter Kerwan. Seismic energy from the Kerwan-forming impact may have been focused on the opposite side of Ceres, fracturing the outer layers of the area and facilitating the movement of high viscosity cryovolcanic magma (consisting of muddy water ice softened by its content of salts) that was then extruded onto the surface. Crater counts suggest that formation of the mountain continued into the last several hundred million years, making this a relatively young geological feature.

Ahuna Mons is associated with a positive mass anomaly, or mascon, centered about 32–36 km (20–22 mi) below it, not far above the crust-mantle boundary. This suggests it was formed by a plume of mud rising from the mantle.

== See also ==
- List of geological features on Ceres
- List of tallest mountains in the Solar System
- Wright Mons – A likely cryovolcanic structure discovered on the dwarf planet Pluto
- Yamor Mons – A similar mountain near Ceres's north pole
