= Fejokoo (crater) =

Impact crater on Ceres

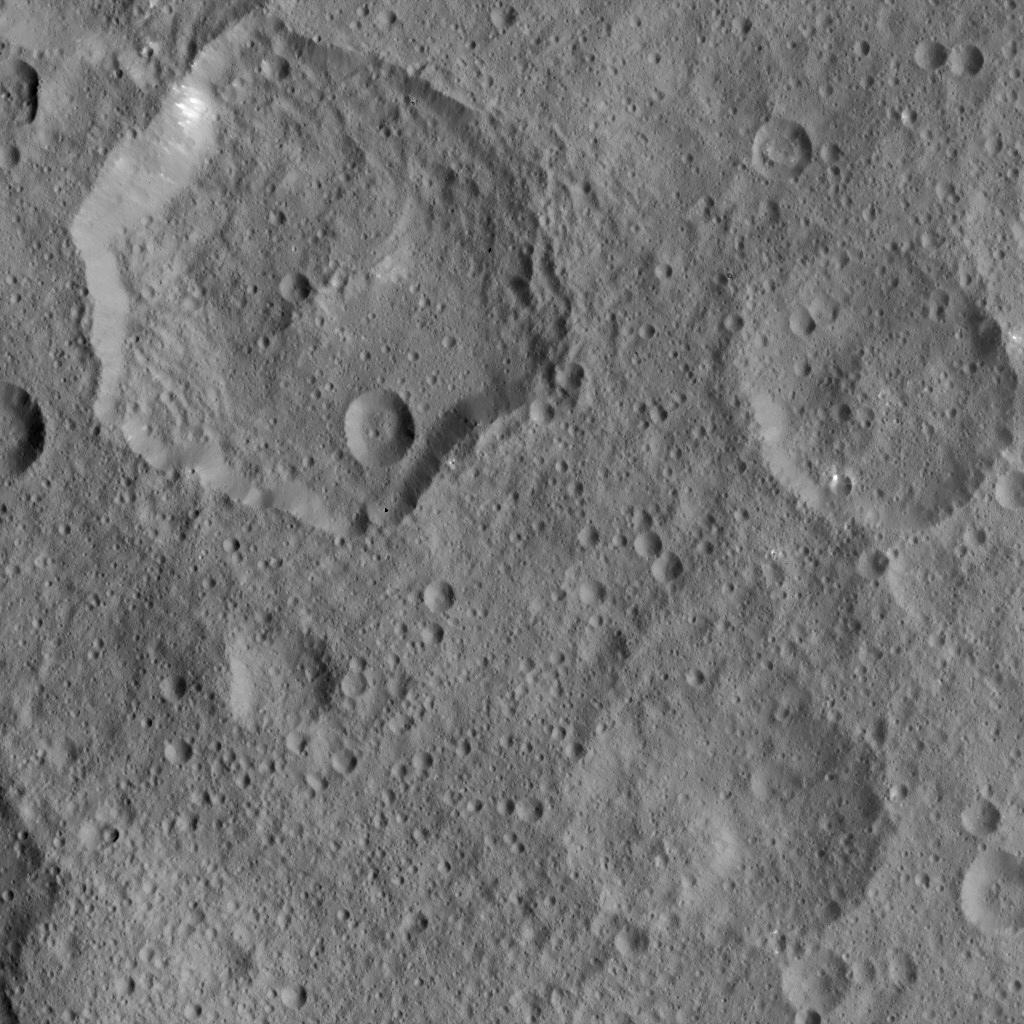
- An image of Fejokoo and surrounding terrain. Fejokoo is the hexagonal crater to the upper left.
- Feature type: Central-peak impact crater
- Location: Fejokoo Quadrangle, Ceres
- Coordinates: 29°9′N 47°53′W
- Diameter: ~68 km
- Depth: ~5 km
- Discoverer: Dawn
- Eponym: Fejokoo

Fejokoo is a hexagonal impact crater on the dwarf planet Ceres. Like all craters on Ceres, it is named after an agricultural deity; the crater is named for the Igbo deity who provided yams. The name was officially approved by the International Astronomical Union (IAU) on 3 July 2015, shortly after Dawn had entered Ceres orbit. Fejokoo is the namesake for the Fejokoo Quadrangle.

In contrast to typical impact craters, which are circular or elliptical in shape, Fejokoo resembles an equilateral hexagon—it is the largest polygonal crater on Ceres. As with most large craters on Ceres, Fejokoo's floor is generally flat and bounded by a very steep rim, with slopes exceeding 45° in some sections. The floor is roughly 5 kilometres (3.1 miles) deep; the floor is interrupted at the center by a central peak roughly 1 kilometre (0.62 miles) high.

The hexagonal shape of Fejokoo likely comes from mass wasting processes such as landslides that have eroded the crater rim. The eastern and western rims are particularly affected, containing terraced landslide material. The surface composition of Fejokoo is overall typical of Ceres, though bright streaks on its northern wall and near its central peak appear to be enriched in ammonia and hydroxides.
