= Abellio =

Celtic god from southwest France

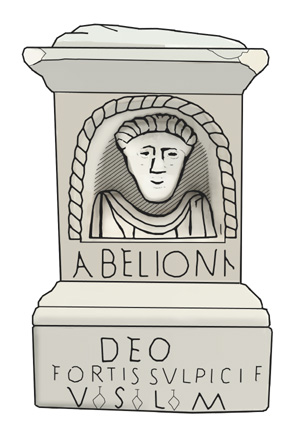
Drawing of a Gallo-Roman votive altar dedicated to Abellio, found in the village of Garin, Haute-Garonne, France

Abellio (also Abelio and Abelionni) was a god worshiped in the Garonne Valley in Gallia Aquitania (now southwest France), known primarily by a number of inscriptions which were discovered in Comminges, in the Pyrenees. He may have been a god of apple trees or the sun.

== Origin and duties ==
Abellio is accounted for in two Roman inscriptions, one spelling the deity Abellio and the other Abelio.

Some scholars have postulated that Abellio is the same name as Apollo, who in Crete and elsewhere was called Abelios (Greek Αβέλιος), and by the Italians and some Dorians Apello, and that the deity is the same as the Gallic Apollo mentioned by Caesar, and also the same as the Belis or Belenus mentioned by Tertullian and Herodian.

Other scholars have taken the reverse position that Abellio might have been a similar solar deity of Celtic origin in Crete and the Pyrenees, but the Cretan Abellio may however not be the same god as the Celtic one, but rather a different manifestation, or dialectal form, of the Greek god Apollo or his name.

In his attempt to connect the Grail legends to the Cathars, Otto Rahn identified the worship of Abellio in the Pyrenees with the Latinized form of Belenus-Apollo whom he equated with Lucifer.

Though some scholars have tried to identify this god as Greek or Celtic, the fact is that the theonym Abellio is only attested among the Aquitani, a people neither Greek nor Celtic. There are three other attested Ballio names in the Roman Empire, all of them anthroponyms and without final N: one in South Italy, and two in Ancient Dalmatia.
