= Bright spots on Ceres =

Surface features discovered 2015

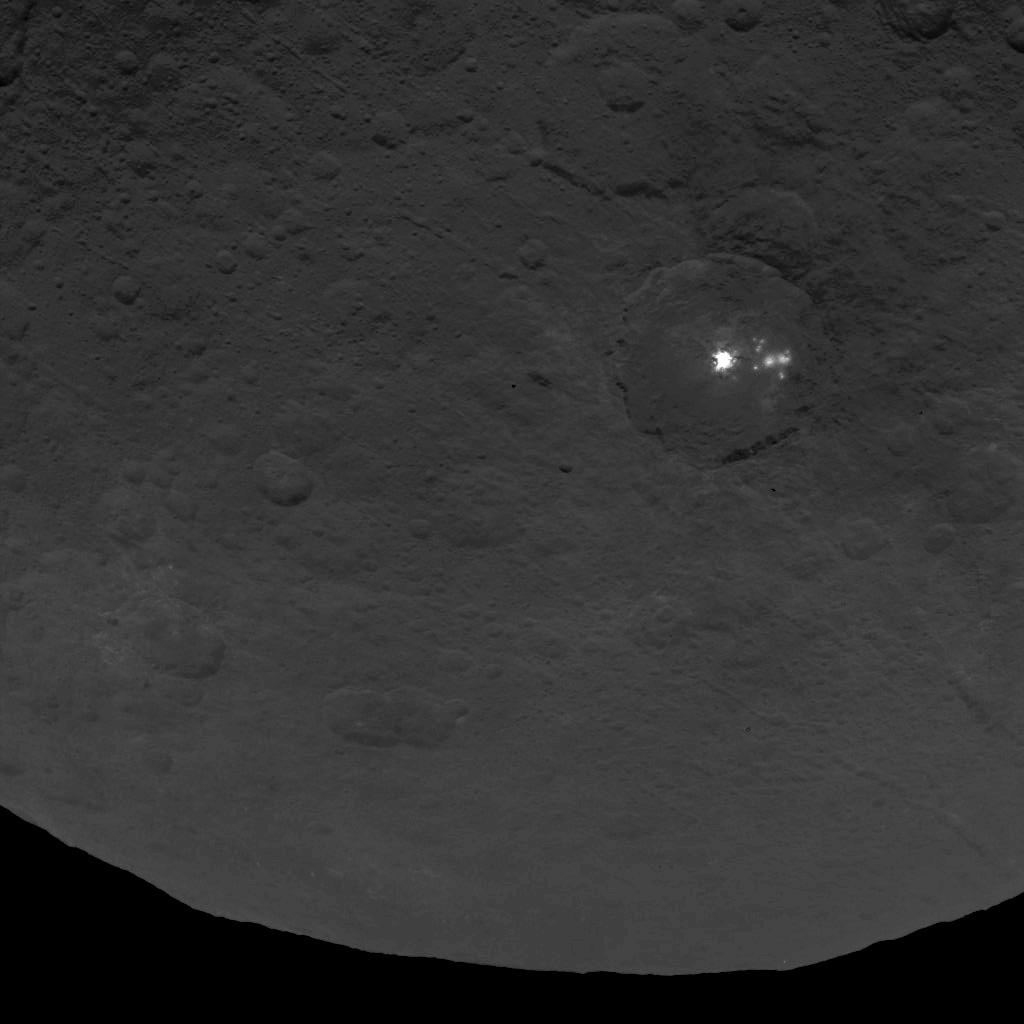
Cerealia and Vinalia Faculae stand out against the dark surface in Occator crater

Several bright surface features (also known as faculae) were discovered on the dwarf planet Ceres by the Dawn spacecraft in 2015. On 9 December 2015, scientists reported that the bright spots on Ceres may be related to a type of salt, particularly a form of brine containing hydrated magnesium sulfate (MgSO_{4}·6H_{2}O); the spots were also found to be associated with ammonia-rich clays. Arizona State University scientists proposed that the bright spots are best explained as resulting from briny water erupted from Ceres's interior that subsequently sublimated, leaving behind only the salt deposits. In August 2020, NASA confirmed that Ceres was a water-rich body with a deep reservoir of brine that percolated to the surface in various locations causing the "bright spots", including those in Occator crater.

The brightest cluster of spots ("Spot 5") is located in an 80-kilometer (50 mi) crater called Occator. The largest and brightest component of the cluster is in the center of the crater, with dimmer spots located towards this crater's eastern rim. Early in the orbital phase of the Dawn mission, the high albedo of these spots was speculated to be due to some kind of outgassing, and subsequent closer images helped scientists determine that it is a material with a high level of reflection, and suggested ice and salt as possibilities. These bright features have an albedo of about 40%, four times brighter than the average of Ceres's surface. Near-infrared spectra of these bright areas are consistent with a large amount of sodium carbonate, (Na_{2}CO_{3}) and smaller amounts of ammonium chloride (NH_{4}Cl) or ammonium bicarbonate (NH_{4}HCO_{3}). These materials have been suggested to originate from the recent crystallization of brines that reached the surface from below.

== Spot 5 ==
The brightest cluster of spots ("Spot 5") is located in an 80-kilometer (50 mi) crater called Occator, which is located at 19.86° N latitude; 238.85 E longitude.

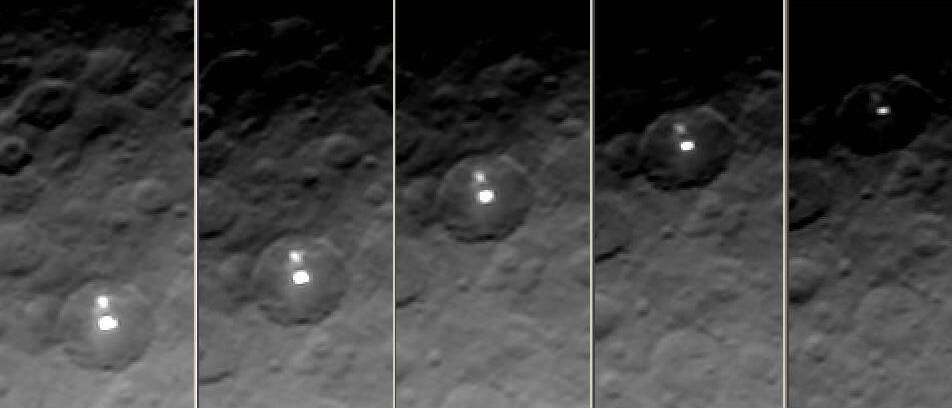
Spots on Ceres from different angles

The spot in the center of the crater is named Cerealia Facula, and the group of spots to the east – Vinalia Faculae. These names were approved by International Astronomical Union 26 November 2016.

Alan Duffy of Swinburne University suggested "a meteorite strike either shook covering material off the salty ice or heated it so that salty water rose to the surface as a geyser. The water escaped into space and now, only the salt remains." A haze that fills around half of Occator crater and that does not extend over its rim periodically appears around Spot 5, the best known bright spot, adding credence to the idea that some sort of outgassing or volcanism is occurring.

Dawn's images led to widespread reports in the media about the bright spots, including in news sources, astronomy magazines, and science magazines. An informal NASA poll during May offered the following ideas for the nature of the spots: ice, volcanos, geysers, salt deposits, rock, or other.

Asteroid specialist Andrew Rivkin noted, in an article by Sky & Telescope magazine, that at low angles a haze can be seen in but not outside of the crater, and speculated that this could be sublimated vapor from ice, possibly linked to the bright spots.

Reflectivity studies from September 2015 suggest that the spots are probably salts rather than ice, implying that Ceres's interior is somehow delivering fresh salt to the surface.

Further analysis of Dawn's low-altitude data indicates two sources: melting of crustal ices by impact, and a deeper brine reservoir (of sodium carbonate and/or ammonium chloride), near or in the mantle. Hanami planum is a topographic high but a gravity low, indicating isostatic compensation, likely by buried ices.

== See also ==
- Ahuna Mons, the tallest mountain on Ceres
- Sublimation
