= Occator (crater) =

Crater on Ceres

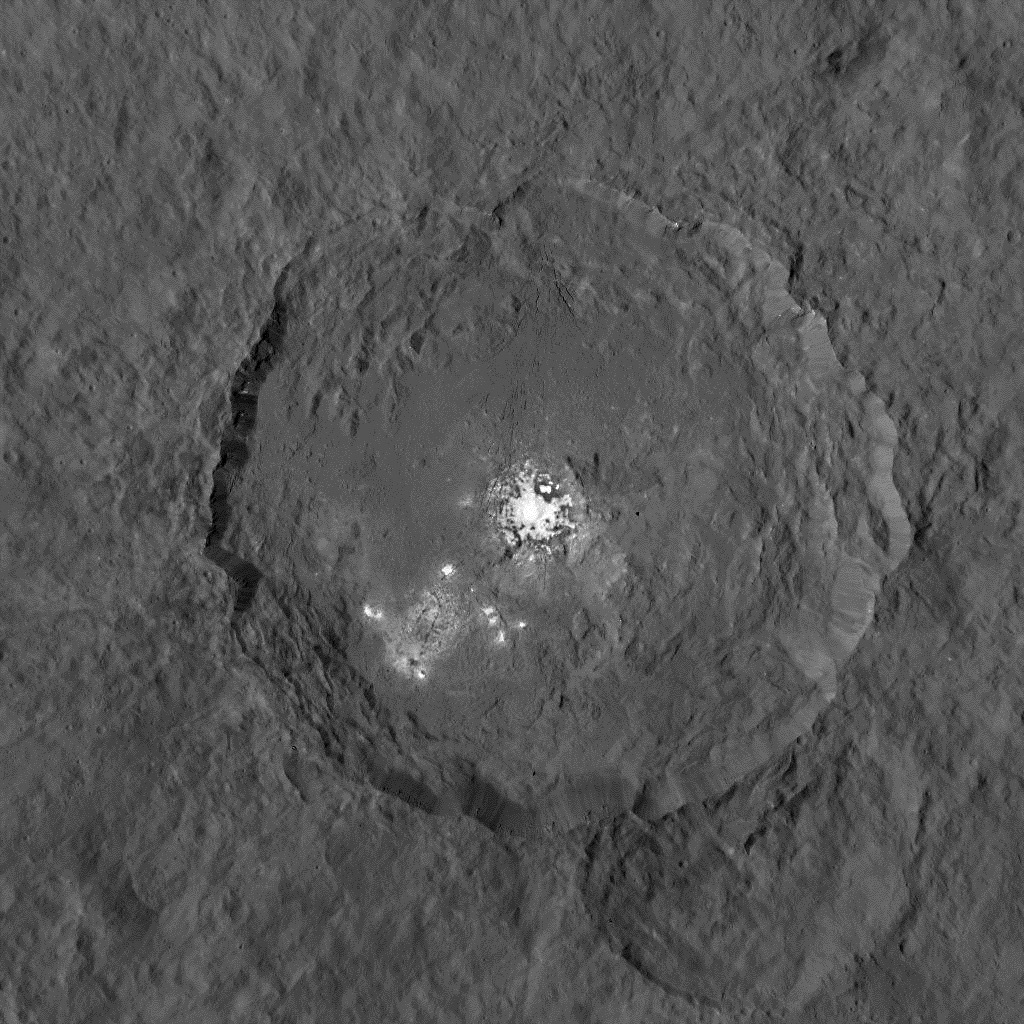
- Occator crater imaged by the Dawn spacecraft. Bright spots and associated fractures are visible.
- Feature type: Impact crater
- Location: Ceres
- Coordinates: 19.86°N 238.85°E
- Diameter: 92 kilometres (57 mi)
- Depth: 3 km
- Discoverer: Dawn
- Naming: After Occātor, a helper God of Ceres

Occator /ɒˈkeɪtər/ is an impact crater located on Ceres, the largest object in the main asteroid belt that lies between the orbits of Mars and Jupiter, that contains "Spot 5", the brightest of the bright spots observed by the Dawn spacecraft. It was known as "Region A" in ground-based images taken by the W. M. Keck Observatory on Mauna Kea.

The crater was named after Occator, the Roman god of the harrow and a helper to Ceres. The name Occator was officially approved by the IAU on 3 July 2015.

On 9 December 2015, scientists reported that the bright spots on Ceres, including those in Occator, may be related to a type of salt, particularly a form of brine containing magnesium sulfate hexahydrite (MgSO_{4}·6H_{2}O); the spots were also found to be associated with ammonia-rich clays. More recently, on 29 June 2016, scientists reported the bright spot to be mostly sodium carbonate (Na_{2}CO_{3}), implying that hydrothermal activity was probably involved in creating the bright spots. In August 2020, NASA confirmed that Ceres was a water-rich body with a deep reservoir of brine that percolated to the surface in various locations causing the "bright spots", including those in Occator crater. The percolation of brine from a deep internal reservoir to the surface at Occator crater was first modeled in 2019.

A small dome in the center of the crater is 3 km across and about 340 meters height. It is named Cerealia Tholus and is covered by bright salt deposits named Cerealia Facula. The group of thinner salt deposits to the east are named Vinalia Faculae [sic]. In July 2018, NASA released a comparison of physical features, including Occator, found on Ceres with similar ones present on Earth.

== Age and formation ==
Between 2015 and 2017 five different attempts were made to discern the age of Occator. The age dating models of the lobate flows and crater ejecta range from 200 million years to 78 million years and 100 million years to 6.09 million. The age ranges have different chronology models, image data at verifying resolution, and different methods to evaluate the data. The current data estimates an age of impact at ~20 to 24.5 million years; however, the estimates are of the sample areas with some uncertainty and variability due to arbitrary cratering and the use of different models to date the impact. Thermal evolution of a large melt chamber below Occator Crater constrained the age of the impact is closer to 18 million years, this is evident in the difference between impact geology and formation of the Cerealia Facula (bright spot).

According to a simulation of the Occator impactor, the body was made of igneous rock and was approximately 5 km in diameter, with an estimated velocity range of 4.8 km/sec to 7.5 km/sec and a target surface lithology of icy-rock material. The simulation variables produced an 80 km impact crater with a central peak and a crater depth of 15 – 30 km.

== Physical features ==
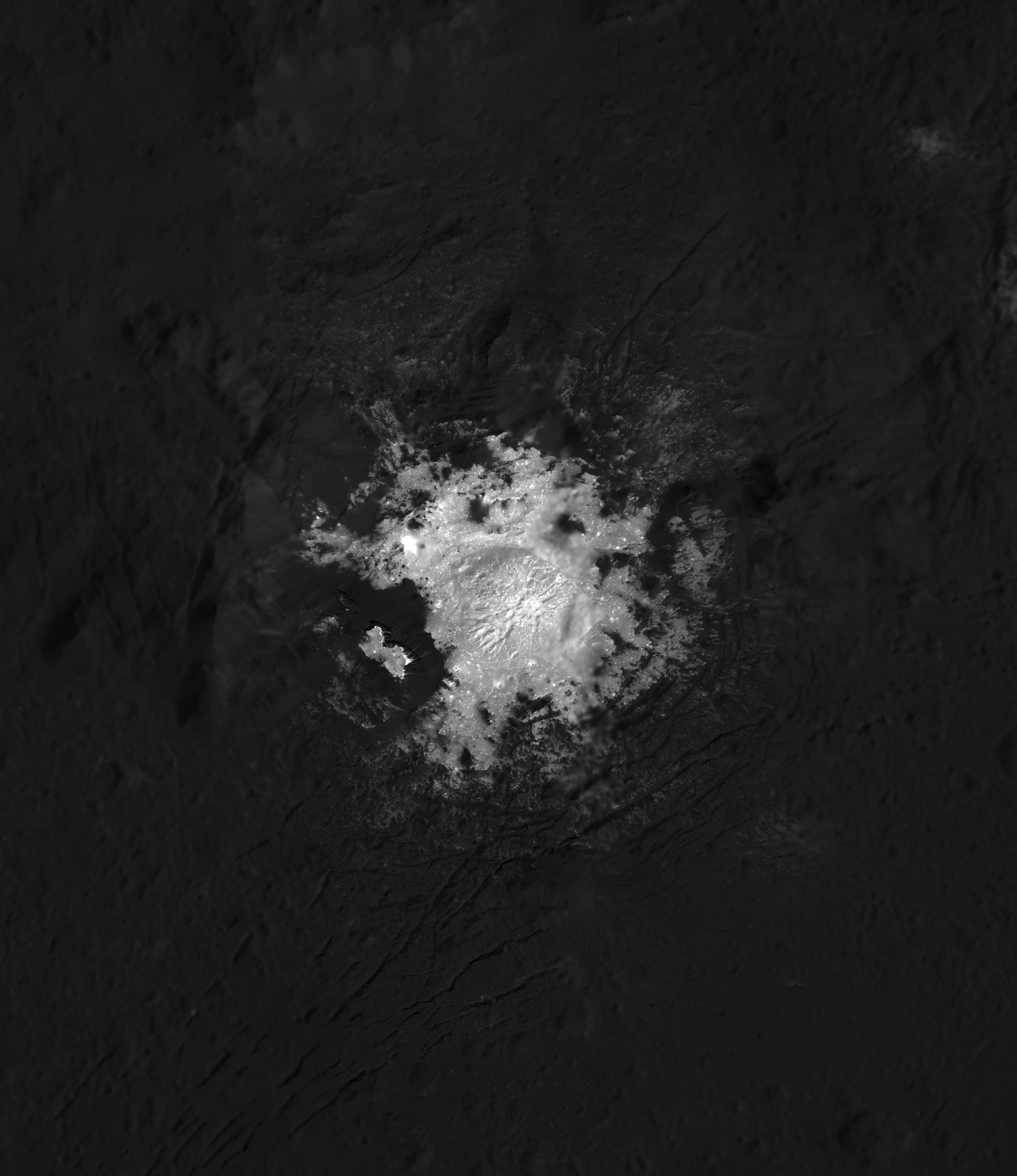
Close-up of Cerealia Facula

=== Bright spots ===
Discovered in 6 March 2015 during the early stages of mapping of Ceres's surface, the Dawn mission located a bright region on the Occator crater floor. The material in this region was determined to have a dominant composition of sodium (Na) carbonates, aluminium (Al) phyllosilicates, and ammonium chloride (NH_{4}Cl). Occator crater’s central 1 km deep depression displays a pronounced luminous feature named Cerealia Facula.

=== Central depression ===
Like most 70-150 km wide Ceresian impact craters, Occator has a central depression rather than a central peak, with its original central peak having collapsed into 9–10 km wide depression, ~1 km deeper than the crater floor. Data indicates that magnesium sulfide (MgS) deposits were in place after the central peak's uplift and collapse. The central depression also contains a 2 km wide dome, which is encompassed by several dense fractures along its flanks.

=== Slopes and floor ===
The northern and southern edges of the convex profile of the crater are rimless with slopes of <10°, while the eastern and western edges of the crater’s depressions are dominated by irregular high standing massifs that formed an incomplete rim around the crater edge.

The Occator crater floor is covered in linear impact fractures from the southwest to the central depression. These fractures cross over the northeast lobate flow deposits at the base of the crater wall that extends into the central depression. The crater floor comprises three central morphological units, which divide the crater into zones. The outermost unit or terrace zone along the crater wall forms a circumferential pattern. This unit contains hummocky and angular material with small to large, tilted fault blocks that vary in size up to ~10 km in diameter and up to 2 km in height. The interior zone of the crater is divided into two different units that have two different morphological characteristics. The Northwestern Interior Zone is primarily hummocky material similar to the terrace zone material. This northwestern unit topography is formed of irregular mounds and uneven ridges and laterally blends into the hummocky faulted terrace unit along the crater wall, making this section very difficult to distinguish between the terrace and interior zones. The material within these zones shows significant displacement from direct relation to the crater wall slumping and floor uplift during the impact event.

The southern half of the crater interior zone is primarily a flat, low-lying topography of lobate deposits covering an estimated 1/3rd of the interior crater floor. Most of the southern u-shaped zone is formed around the central dome and opens to the structure’s northwest. The local relief of the topography within the lobate deposits of the southern half of the interior zone constraints within ~100 m. The topography relief of the western half of the interior zone has a gentle increase of the slope ~500 m.

The asymmetrical change in relief of the lobate deposits located in the southern half of the interior indicates two significant factors. First, the impactor made an oblique angle impact trending from the southeast to the northwest. Second, the target had variations in composition or topography that altered the impact. Near the central depression and slightly offset from the center is an ~ 3 km wide dome structure with an upper surface densely covered in cross pattern fractures. These fractures become less evident along the flanks and are believed not to extend into the walls of the depression (pit) structure. The bright material deposits extend to the inward-facing wall of the depression and transition to the dome structure’s exterior wall. This deposition pattern indicates the deposits formed within the contiguous geological unit and that the uplift and fracturing formed before deposition.

=== Surrounding region ===
The Ac-9 Occator quadrangle is located on an elevated equatorial region and is the brightest region of the dwarf planet Ceres. Occator is the central feature of its eponymous quadrungle. The Ac-9 shows heavily fractured crater floors and is consistently shallow compared to similar size non-fractured crater floors.

== See also ==
- List of geological features on Ceres
