= Tuupo =

Tuupo is a surname. Notable people with the surname include:

- Tupo Tuupo (born 1978), American Samoan player of American football
- Elisapeta Tuupo‐Alaimaleata, American-Samoan educator
