= Tupo =

Tupo may refer to:

- Tupo (crater), on the dwarf planet Ceres
- Tupo Fa'amasino (born 1966), Samoan rugby union player
- Tupo Tuupo (born 1978), American Samoan player of American football
- Tupo station, North Korea
