= Elisapeta =

Elisapeta is a feminine given name. Known people with the name include:

- Elisapeta Heta, New Zealand Māori architect
- Elisapeta Toeava (born 1994), Samoan-New Zealand netball player
- Elisapeta Tuupo‐Alaimaleata, Samoan-American educator
