= 145 Adeona =

Main-belt asteroid

- VLT-SPHERE image of Adeona

Discovery
- Discovered by: Christian Heinrich Friedrich Peters
- Discovery date: 3 June 1875

Designations
- Pronunciation: /ædiːˈoʊnə/
- Named after: Adeōna
- Minor planet category: main-belt · Adeona
- Adjectives: Adeonian

Orbital characteristics
- Epoch 31 July 2016 (JD 2457600.5)
- Uncertainty parameter 0
- Observation arc: 130.60 yr (47700 d)
- Aphelion: 3.05972 AU (457.728 Gm)
- Perihelion: 2.28737 AU (342.186 Gm)
- Semi-major axis: 2.67354 AU (399.956 Gm)
- Eccentricity: 0.14444
- Orbital period (sidereal): 4.37 yr (1596.7 d)
- Mean anomaly: 233.709°
- Mean motion: 0° 13^{m} 31.663^{s} / day
- Inclination: 12.6337°
- Longitude of ascending node: 77.4206°
- Argument of perihelion: 44.0233°

Physical characteristics
- Dimensions: (153 × 142 × 141) ± 3 km
- Mean diameter: 144±3 km
- Mass: (2.4±0.3)×10^{18} kg (composite estimate) (2.08±0.34)×10^{18} kg (Note: Calculated from its standard gravitational parameter GM = 0.139±0.023 km^{3}/s^{2}.)
- Mean density: 1.52±0.21 g/cm^{3} 1.33±0.24 g/cm^{3}
- Equatorial surface gravity: 0.0422 m/s^{2}
- Equatorial escape velocity: 0.0799 km/s
- Synodic rotation period: 15.07081±0.00001 h
- Axial tilt: 48°
- Pole ecliptic longitude: 101° ± 4°
- Pole ecliptic latitude: 48° ± 3°
- Geometric albedo: 0.048 (calculated); 0.061±0.010; 0.0467 ± 0.0116
- Spectral type: C (Tholen)
- Absolute magnitude (H): 8.13, 8.43, 8.050

145 Adeona is a large asteroid from the intermediate asteroid belt, approximately 150 kilometers (93 miles) in diameter. Its surface is very dark, and, based upon its classification as a C-type asteroid, is probably composed of primitive carbonaceous material. The spectra of the asteroid displays evidence of aqueous alteration. The Adeona family of asteroids is named after it.

It was discovered by C. H. F. Peters on June 3, 1875, from the observatory at Hamilton College, Clinton, New York. Peters named it after Adeona, the Roman goddess of homecoming, because he had recently returned from a journey across the world to observe the transit of Venus. Peters also discovered 144 Vibilia on the same night.

During 2001, Adeona was observed by radar from the Arecibo Observatory. The returned signal matched an effective diameter of 151 ± 18 km. This is consistent with the asteroid dimensions computed through other means.

Two stellar occultations by Adeona have been observed: The first one on July 9, 2002 when it occulted an 11.8 mag star, and then again on February 3, 2005 when several observers in Japan recorded the occultation of a 10.4 mag star. The latter was consistent with a diameter of 151 km.

The Dawn mission team discussed performing a flyby of this object, however NASA decided against it in July 2016. At the time this was considered Dawn was orbiting the large asteroid/dwarf planet 1 Ceres, and went on studying that body later that year. Dawn had previously orbited asteroid 4 Vesta, before traveling to Ceres.

== See also ==
- List of minor planets formerly targeted for spacecraft visitation
