= Adeona family =

Asteroid family

The Adeona or Adeonian family (FIN: 505) is a large asteroid family that formed from the parent body 145 Adeona. Its spectral type is that of a carbonaceous C-type, with currently 2,236 asteroids identified as family members. Based upon simulation studies, the Adeonian family is believed to be no more than 600 million years old, compared to a typical asteroid family age of 1–2 billion years.

Close encounters with large asteroids may have significantly impacted the dynamic evolution of this group. At higher velocity cut-off distances (55 m s^{−1}), members of this family may form interlopers in the large Eunomia family, and vice versa.
