= Tupo (crater) =

Crater on dwarf planet Ceres

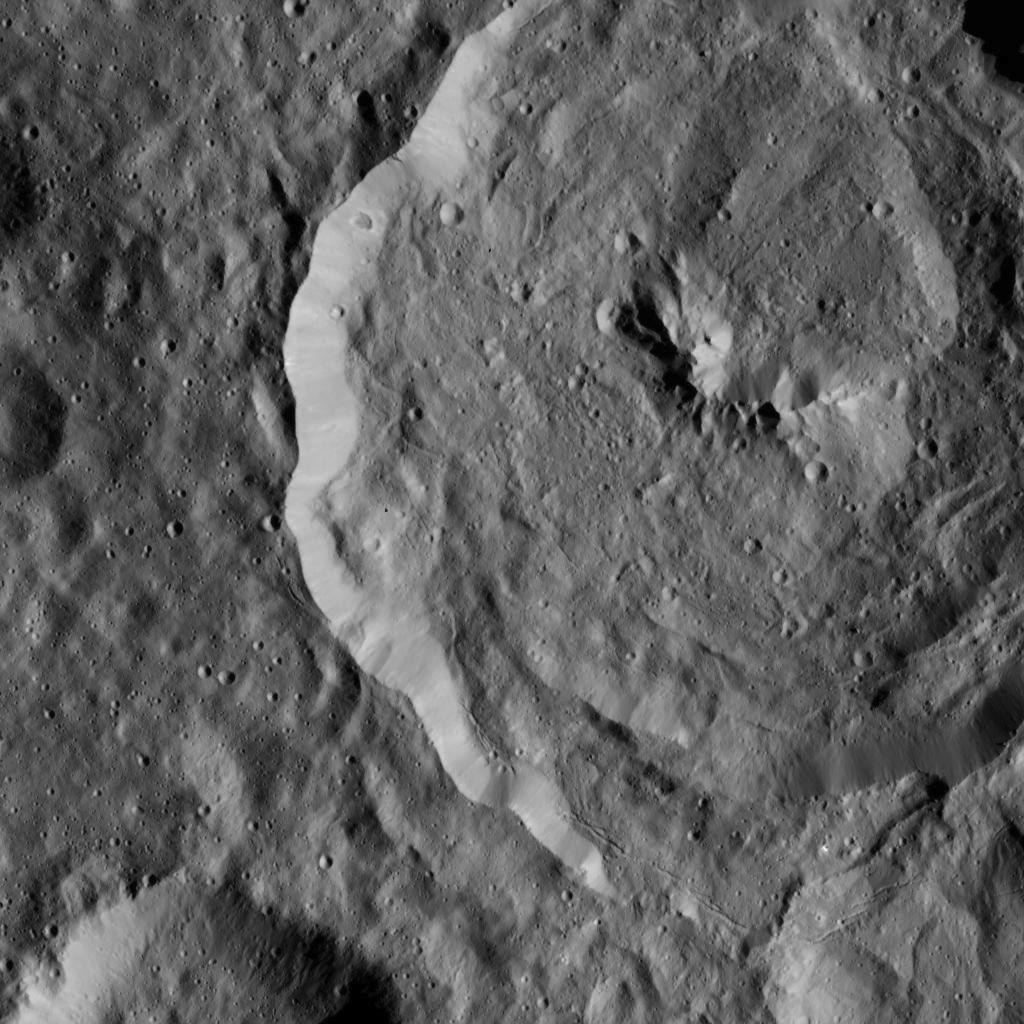
- Dawn photo showing Tupo crater
- Feature type: Impact crater
- Location: Ceres
- Coordinates: 32.35°S 88.38°E
- Diameter: 36 km
- Discoverer: Dawn
- Eponym: Mangarevan god

Tupo is an impact crater in the southern hemisphere of the dwarf planet Ceres, located at 32.35° S, 88.38° E. It has a diameter of 36 km. The crater is named after a Polynesian deity, that was invoked on the island Mangareva during the planting of turmeric.
