= Dawn (spacecraft) =

NASA orbiter mission to asteroid Vesta and dwarf planet Ceres (2007–2018)

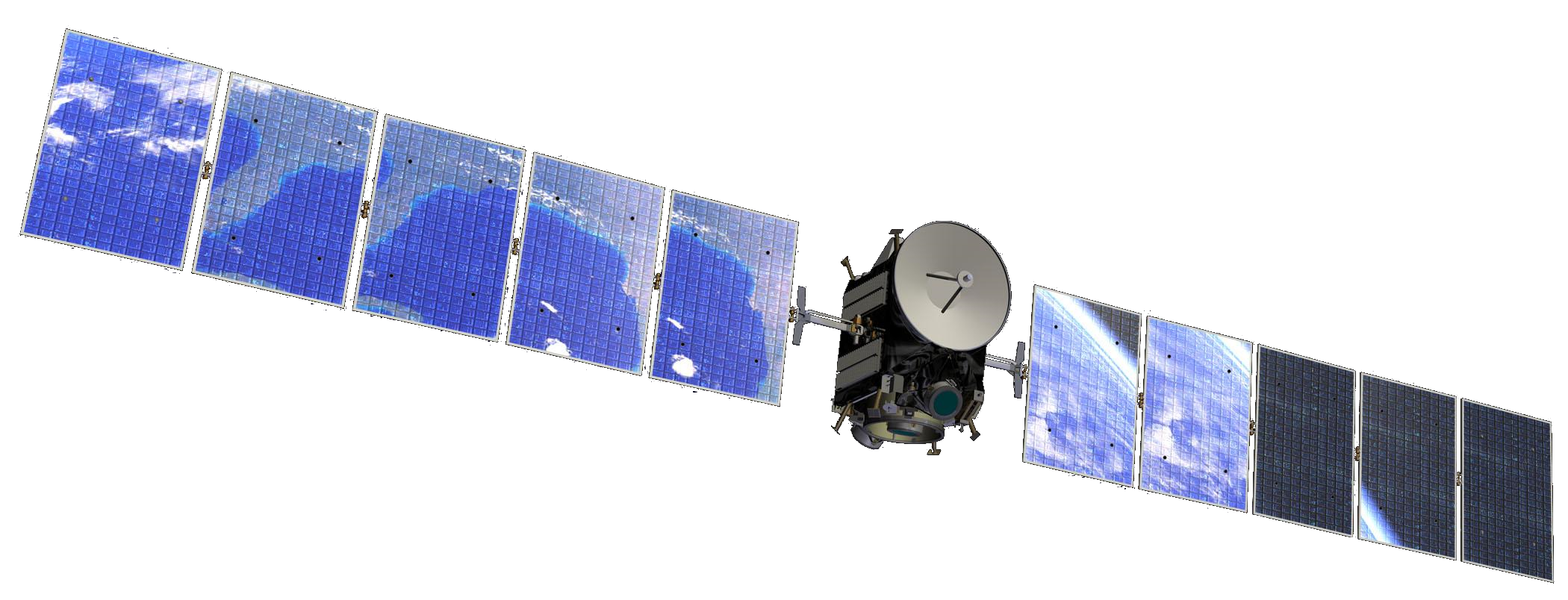
- 3D Illustration of the Dawn spacecraft
- Mission type: Vesta/Ceres orbiter
- Operator: NASA / JPL
- COSPAR ID: 2007-043A
- SATCAT no.: 32249
- Website: science.nasa.gov
- Mission duration: 11 years, 1 month and 5 days

Spacecraft properties
- Manufacturer: Orbital Sciences; JPL; UCLA
- Launch mass: 1,217.7 kg (2,684.6 lb)
- Dry mass: 747.1 kg (1,647.1 lb)
- Dimensions: 1.64 × 19.7 × 1.77 m (5.4 × 65 × 5.8 ft)
- Power: 10 kW at 1 AU; 1.3 kW at 3 AU

Start of mission
- Launch date: September 27, 2007, 11:34 UTC
- Rocket: Delta II 7925H; D-327
- Launch site: Cape Canaveral SLC-17B
- Contractor: United Launch Alliance

End of mission
- Disposal: Decommissioned
- Last contact: October 30, 2018
- Decay date: ~2038

Orbital parameters
- Reference system: Ceres
- Regime: Highly elliptical
- Semi-major axis: 2,475.1356 km (1,537.9780 mi)
- Eccentricity: 0.7952
- Periapsis altitude: 37.004 km (22.993 mi)
- Apoapsis altitude: 3,973.866 km (2,469.246 mi)
- Inclination: 76.1042°
- Period: 1,628.68 minutes
- RAAN: −79.4891°
- Argument of periapsis: 164.1014°
- Epoch: October 30, 2018, 00:00:00 UTC

Flyby of Mars
- Closest approach: February 18, 2009, 00:27:58 UTC
- Distance: 542 km (337 mi)

4 Vesta orbiter
- Orbital insertion: July 16, 2011, 04:47 UTC
- Orbital departure: September 5, 2012, 06:26 UTC

1 Ceres orbiter
- Orbital insertion: March 6, 2015, 12:29 UTC
Instruments
- FC: Framing Camera
- VIR: Visible and Infrared Spectrometer
- GRaND: Gamma Ray and Neutron Detector
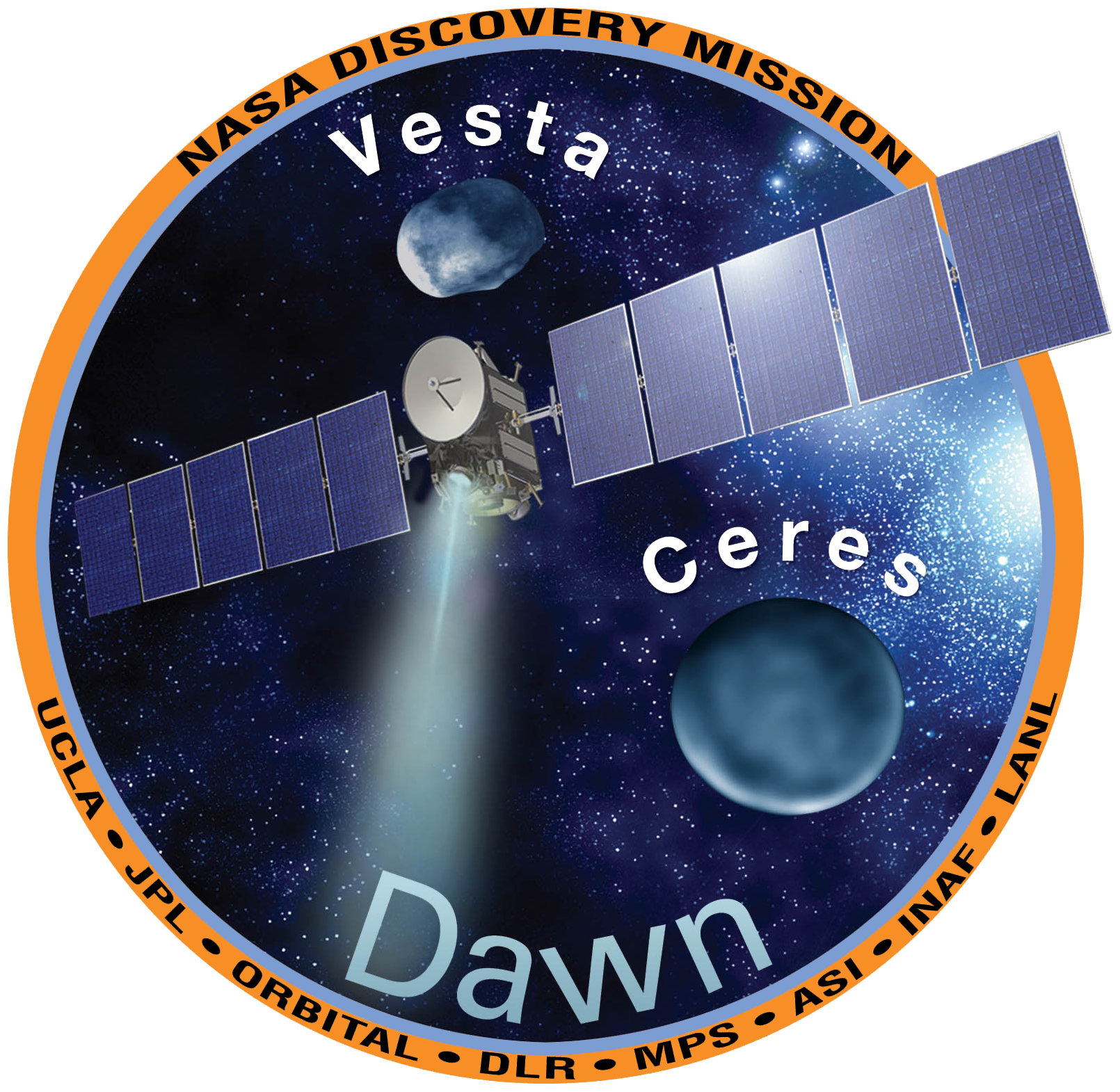
- Dawn mission patch Discovery Program

Dawn is a retired space probe that was launched by NASA in September 2007 with the mission of studying two of the three known protoplanets of the asteroid belt: Vesta and Ceres. In the fulfillment of that mission—the ninth in NASA's Discovery Program—Dawn entered orbit around Vesta on July 16, 2011, and completed a 14-month survey mission before leaving for Ceres in late 2012. It entered orbit around Ceres on March 6, 2015. In 2017, NASA announced that the planned nine-year mission would be extended until the probe's hydrazine fuel supply was depleted. On November 1, 2018, NASA announced that Dawn had depleted its hydrazine, and the mission was ended. The derelict probe remains in a stable orbit around Ceres.

Dawn is the first spacecraft to have orbited two extraterrestrial bodies, the first spacecraft to have visited either Vesta or Ceres, and the first to have orbited a dwarf planet.

The Dawn mission was managed by NASA's Jet Propulsion Laboratory, with spacecraft components contributed by European partners from Italy, Germany, France, and the Netherlands. It was the first NASA exploratory mission to use ion propulsion, which enabled it to enter and leave the orbit of two celestial bodies. Previous multi-target missions using rockets powered by chemical engines, such as the Voyager program, were restricted to flybys.

== Project history ==
=== Technological background ===
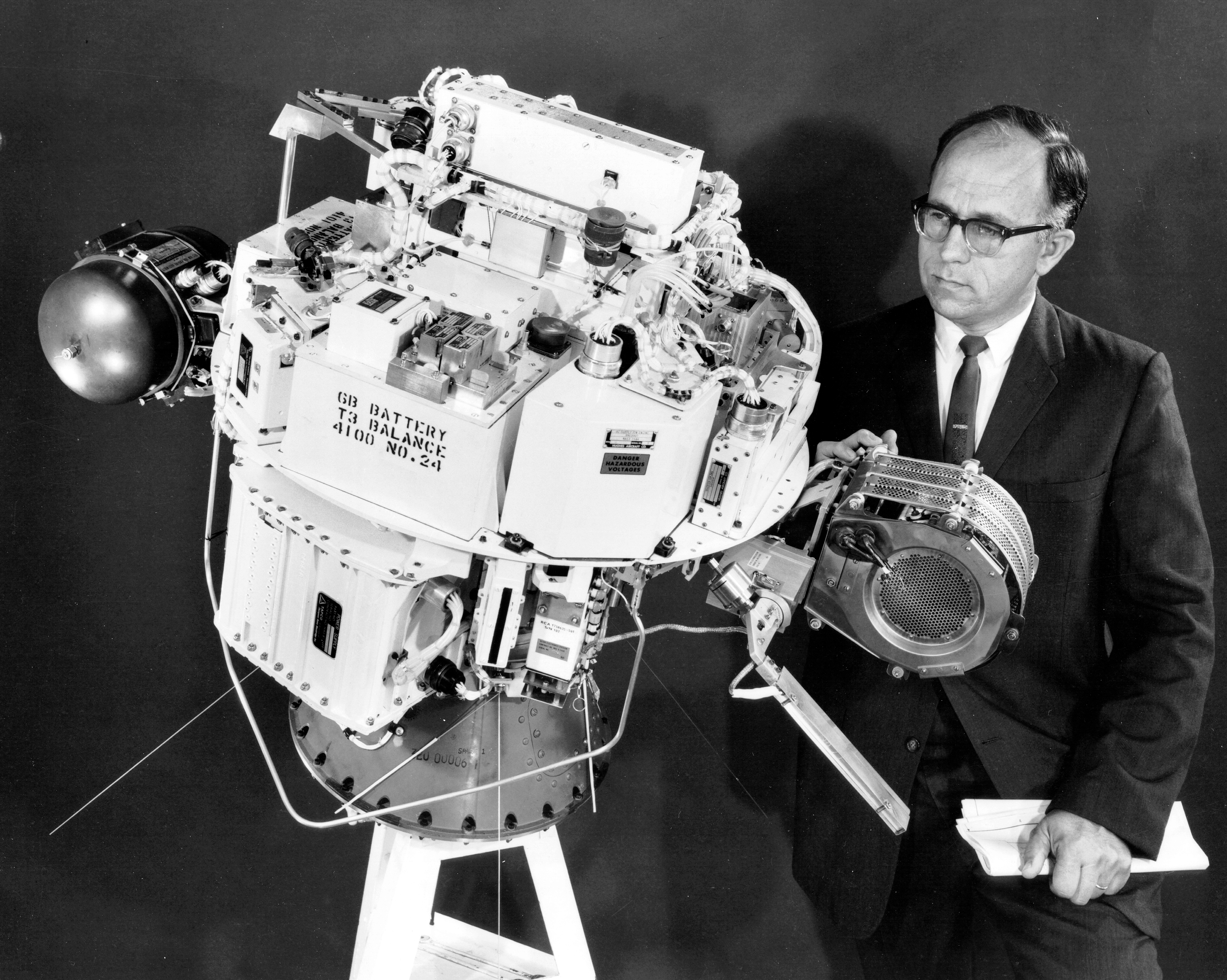
SERT-1: first ion engine NASA spacecraft; launched on July 20, 1964.

The first working ion thruster in the US was built by Harold R. Kaufman in 1959 at NASA's Glenn Research Center in Ohio. The thruster was similar to the general design of a gridded electrostatic ion thruster with mercury as its propellant. Suborbital tests of the engine followed during the 1960s, and in 1964 the engine was tested on a suborbital flight aboard the Space Electric Rocket Test 1 (SERT 1). It successfully operated for the planned 31 minutes before falling back to Earth. This test was followed by an orbital test, SERT-2, in 1970.

Deep Space 1 (DS1), which NASA launched in 1998, demonstrated the long-duration use of a xenon-propelled ion thruster on a science mission, and validated a number of technologies, including the NSTAR electrostatic ion thruster, as well as performing a flyby of an asteroid and a comet. In addition to the ion thruster, among the other technologies validated by the DS1 was the Small Deep Space Transponder, which is used on Dawn for long-range communication.

=== Discovery Program selection ===
Twenty-six proposals were submitted to the Discovery Program solicitation, with budget initially targeted at US$300 million. Three semi-finalists were downselected in January 2001 for a phase-A design study: Dawn, Kepler, and INSIDE Jupiter. In December 2001 NASA selected the Kepler and the Dawn mission for the Discovery program. Both missions were initially selected for a launch in 2006.

=== Cancellation and reinstatement ===
The status of the Dawn mission changed several times. The project was cancelled in December 2003, and then reinstated in February 2004. In October 2005, work on Dawn was placed in "stand down" mode, and in January 2006, the mission was discussed in the press as "indefinitely postponed", even though NASA had made no new announcements regarding its status. On March 2, 2006, Dawn was again cancelled by NASA.

The spacecraft's manufacturer, Orbital Sciences Corporation, appealed NASA's decision, offering to build the spacecraft at cost, forgoing any profit in order to gain experience in a new market field. NASA then put the cancellation under review, and on March 27, 2006, it was announced that the mission would not be cancelled after all. In the last week of September 2006, the Dawn mission's instrument payload integration reached full functionality. Although originally projected to cost US$373 million, cost overruns inflated the final cost of the mission to US$446 million in 2007. Christopher T. Russell was chosen to lead the Dawn mission team.

== Scientific background ==
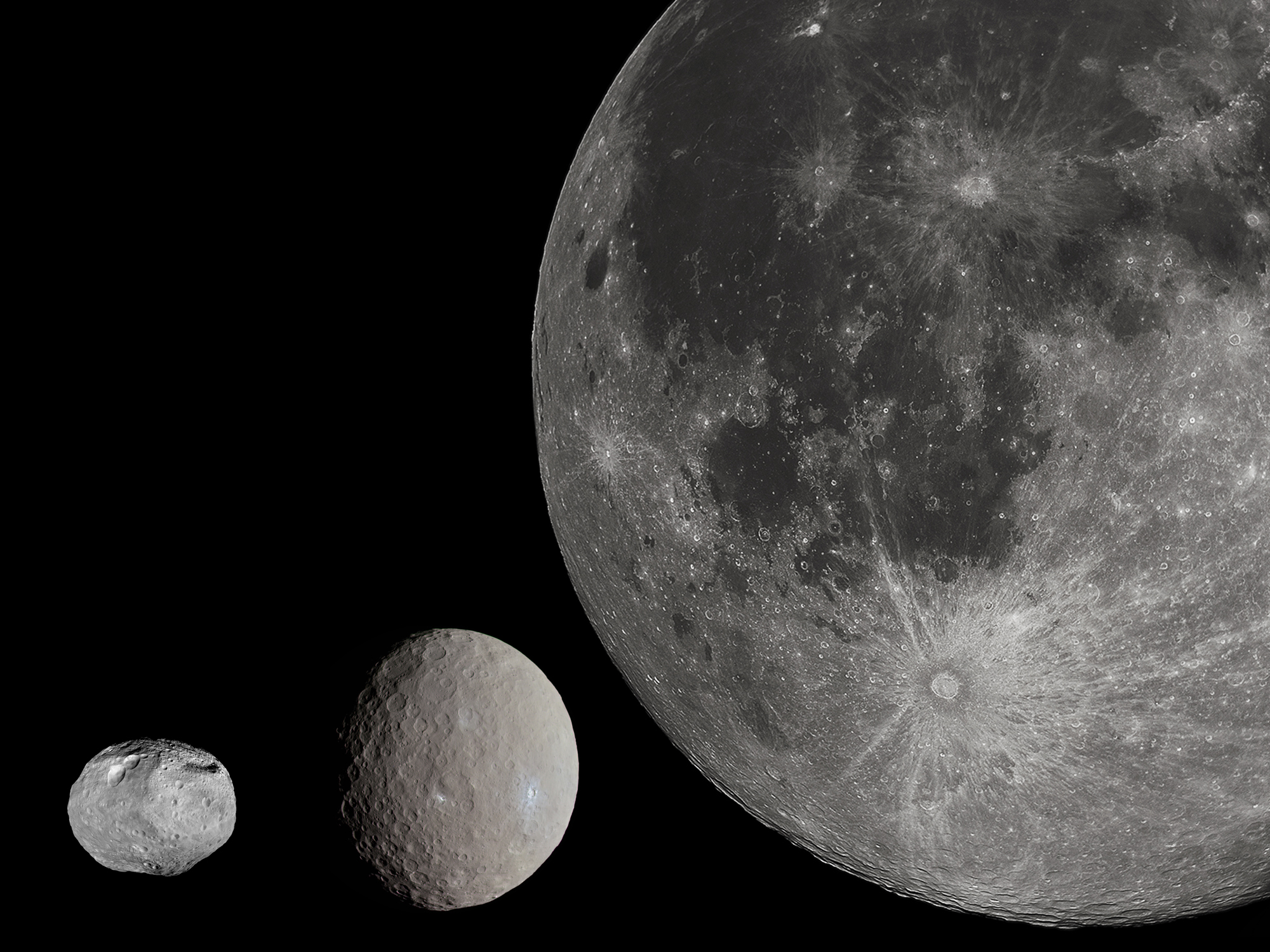
Scale comparison of Vesta, Ceres, and the Moon

The Dawn mission was designed to study two large bodies in the asteroid belt in order to answer questions about the formation of the Solar System, as well as to test the performance of its ion thrusters in deep space. Ceres and Vesta were chosen as two contrasting protoplanets, the first one apparently "wet" (i.e. icy and cold) and the other "dry" (i.e. rocky), whose accretion was terminated by the formation of Jupiter. The two bodies provide a bridge in scientific understanding between the formation of rocky planets and the icy bodies of the Solar System, and under what conditions a rocky planet can hold water.

The International Astronomical Union (IAU) adopted a new definition of planet on August 24, 2006, which introduced the term "dwarf planet" for ellipsoidal worlds that were too small to qualify for planetary status by "clearing their orbital neighborhood" of other orbiting matter. Dawn is the first mission to study a dwarf planet, arriving at Ceres a few months before the arrival of the New Horizons probe at Pluto in July 2015.

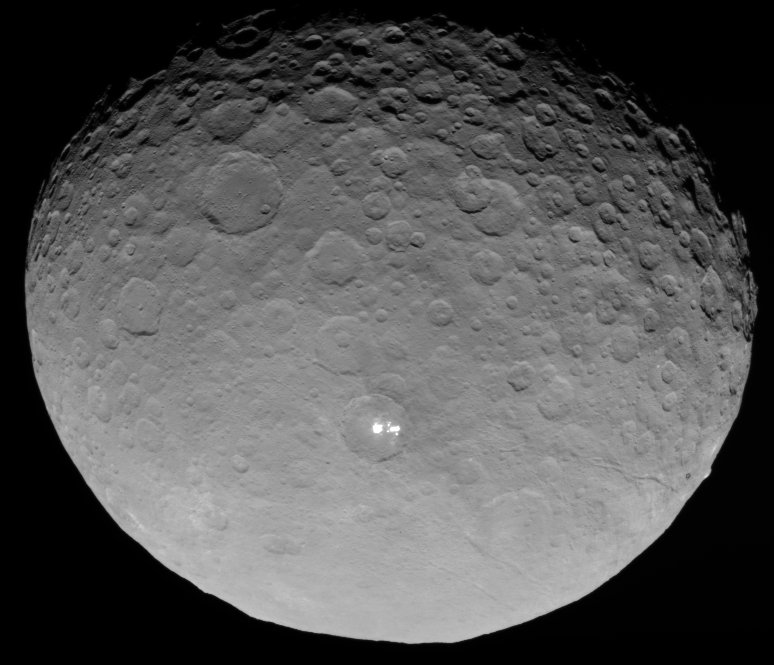
Dawn image of Ceres from 13,600 km, May 4, 2015

Ceres comprises a third of the total mass of the asteroid belt. Its spectral characteristics suggest a composition similar to that of a water-rich carbonaceous chondrite. Vesta, a smaller, water-poor achondritic asteroid comprising a tenth of the mass of the asteroid belt, has experienced significant heating and differentiation. It shows signs of a metallic core, a Mars-like density and lunar-like basaltic flows.

Available evidence indicates that both bodies formed very early in the history of the Solar System, thereby retaining a record of events and processes from the time of the formation of the terrestrial planets. Radionuclide dating of pieces of meteorites thought to come from Vesta suggests that Vesta differentiated quickly, in three million years or less. Thermal evolution studies suggest that Ceres must have formed some time later, more than three million years after the formation of CAIs (the oldest known objects of Solar System origin).

Moreover, Vesta appears to be the source of many smaller objects in the Solar System. Most (but not all) V-type near-Earth asteroids, and some outer main-belt asteroids, have spectra similar to Vesta, and are thus known as vestoids. Five percent of the meteoritic samples found on Earth, the howardite–eucrite–diogenite (HED) meteorites, are thought to be the result of a collision or collisions with Vesta.

It is thought that Ceres may have a differentiated interior; its oblateness appears too small for an undifferentiated body, which indicates that it consists of a rocky core overlain with an icy mantle. There is a large collection of potential samples from Vesta accessible to scientists, in the form of over 1,400 HED meteorites, giving insight into Vesta geologic history and structure. Vesta is thought to consist of a metallic iron–nickel core, an overlying rocky olivine mantle and crust.

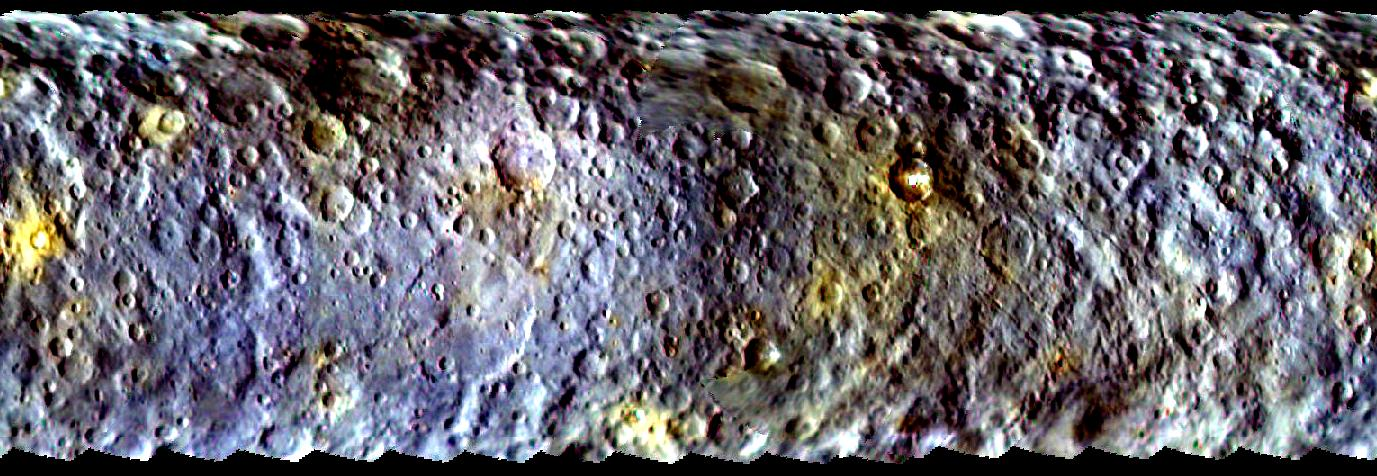
The first color map of Ceres by Dawn (exaggerated color, March 2015)

== Objectives ==
Animation of Dawn's trajectory from September 27, 2007, to October 5, 2018 Dawn · Earth · Mars · 4 Vesta · 1 Ceres

Dawn's approximate flight trajectory

The Dawn mission's goal was to characterize the conditions and processes of the Solar System's earliest eon by investigating in detail two of the largest protoplanets remaining intact since their formation.

Although the mission has finished, the data analyses and interpretations will continue for many years. The primary question that the mission addresses is the role of size and water in determining the evolution of the planets. Ceres and Vesta are highly suitable bodies with which to address this question, as they are two of the most massive of the protoplanets. Ceres is geologically very primitive and icy, while Vesta is evolved and rocky. Their contrasting characteristics are thought to have resulted from them forming in two different regions of the early Solar System.

There are three principal scientific drivers for the mission. First, the Dawn mission can capture the earliest moments in the origin of the Solar System, granting an insight into the conditions under which these objects formed. Second, Dawn determines the nature of the building blocks from which the terrestrial planets formed, improving scientific understanding of this formation. Finally, it contrasts the formation and evolution of two small planets that followed very different evolutionary paths, allowing scientists to determine what factors control that evolution.

== Instruments ==
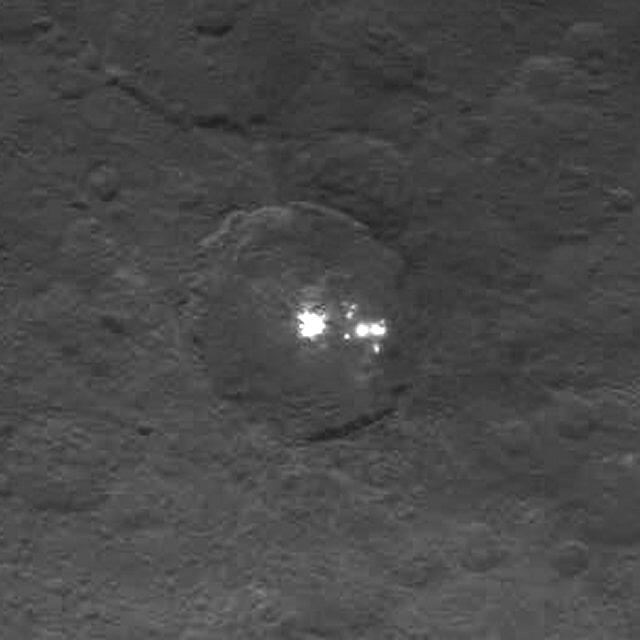
Framing camera view of the Ceres bright spots

NASA's Jet Propulsion Laboratory provided overall planning and management of the mission, the flight system and scientific payload development, and provided the ion propulsion system. Orbital Sciences Corporation provided the spacecraft, which constituted the company's first interplanetary mission. The Max Planck Institute for Solar System Research and the German Aerospace Center (DLR) provided the framing cameras, the Italian Space Agency provided the mapping spectrometer, and the Los Alamos National Laboratory provided the gamma ray and neutron spectrometer.

- Framing camera (FC) – Two redundant framing cameras were flown. Each used a f/7.9 refractive optical system with a focal length of 150 mm. A frame-transfer charge-coupled device (CCD), a Thomson TH7888A, at the focal plane has 1024 × 1024 sensitive 93-μrad pixels, imaging a 5.5° x 5.5° field of view. An 8-position filter wheel permits panchromatic (clear filter) and spectrally selective imaging (7 narrow band filters). The broadest filter allows imaging at wavelengths from 400 to 1050 nm. The FC computer is a custom radiation-hardened Xilinx system with a LEON2 core and 8 GiB of memory. The camera offered resolutions of 17 m/pixel for Vesta and 66 m/pixel for Ceres. Because the framing camera was vital for both science and navigation, the payload had two identical and physically separate cameras (FC1 & FC2) for redundancy, each with its own optics, electronics, and structure.
- Visible and infrared spectrometer (VIR) – This instrument is a modification of the visible and infrared thermal-imaging spectrometer used on the Rosetta and Venus Express spacecraft. It draws its heritage from the Saturn orbiter Cassini's visible and infrared mapping spectrometer. The spectrometer's VIR spectral frames are 256 (spatial) × 432 (spectral), and the slit length is 64 mrad. The mapping spectrometer incorporates two channels, both fed by a single grating. A CCD yields frames from 0.25 to 1.0 μm, while an array of HgCdTe photodiodes cooled to about 70 K spans the spectrum from 0.95 to 5.0 μm.
- Gamma Ray and Neutron Detector (GRaND) – This instrument is based on similar instruments flown on the Lunar Prospector and Mars Odyssey space missions. It had 21 sensors with a very wide field of view. It was used to measure the abundances of the major rock-forming elements (oxygen, magnesium, aluminium, silicon, calcium, titanium, and iron) and potassium, thorium, uranium, and water (inferred from hydrogen content) in the top 1 m of the surface of Vesta and Ceres.

A magnetometer and laser altimeter were considered for the mission, but were not ultimately flown.

== Specifications ==
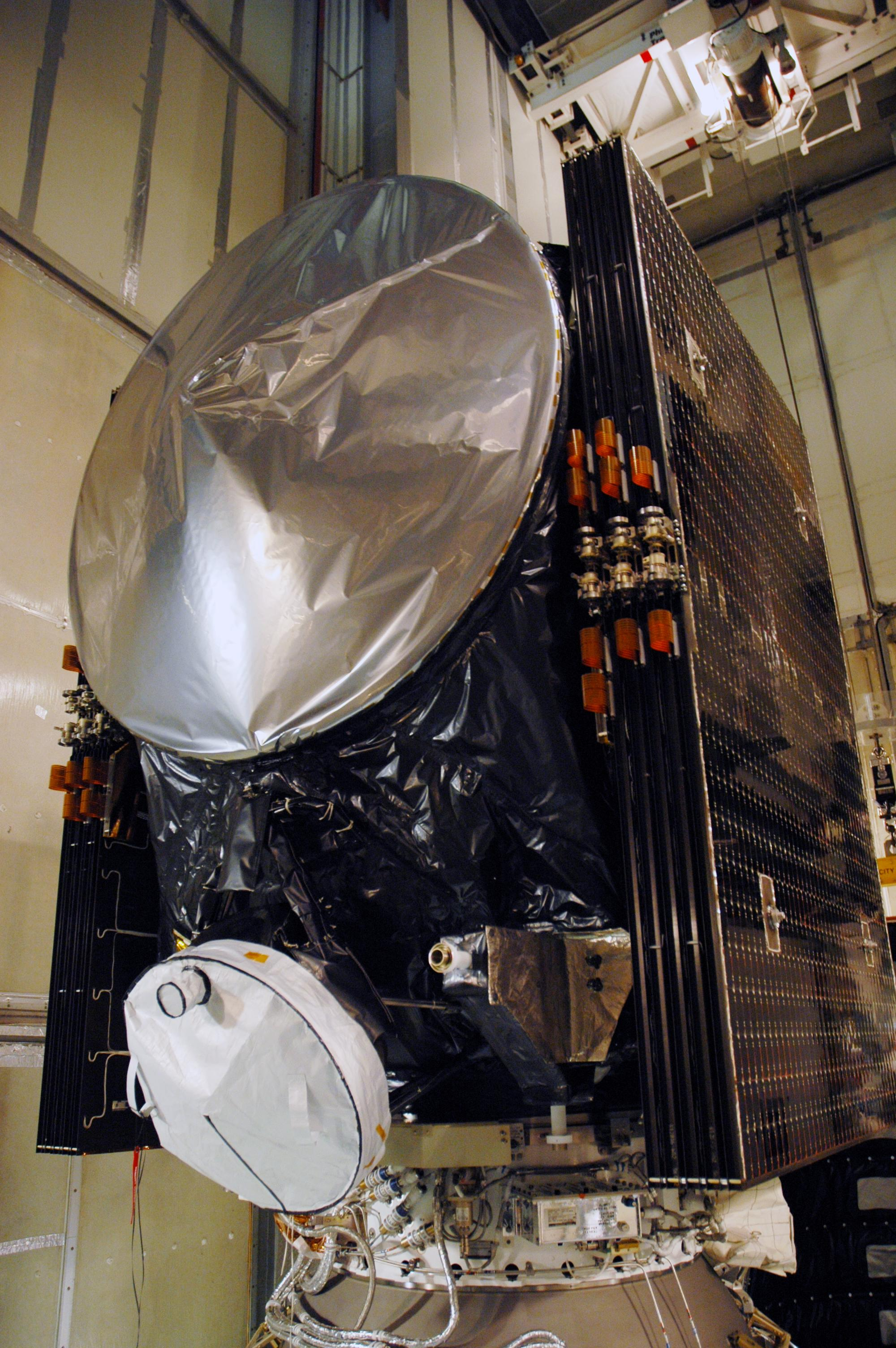
Dawn prior to encapsulation at its launch pad on July 1, 2007

=== Dimensions ===
With its solar array in the retracted launch position, the Dawn spacecraft is 2.36 metres (7.7 ft) wide. With its solar arrays fully extended, Dawn is 19.7 m (65 ft) wide. The solar arrays have a total area of 36.4 m^{2} (392 sq ft). The main antenna is five feet (1.24 metres) in diameter.

=== Propulsion system ===
The Dawn spacecraft was propelled by three xenon ion thrusters derived from NSTAR technology used by the Deep Space 1 spacecraft, using one at a time. They have a specific impulse of 3,100 s and produce a thrust of 90 mN. The whole spacecraft, including the ion propulsion thrusters, was powered by a 10 kW (at 1 AU) triple-junction gallium arsenide photovoltaic solar array manufactured by Dutch Space. Dawn was allocated 247 kg (545 lb) of xenon for its Vesta approach, and carried another 112 kg (247 lb) to reach Ceres, out of a total capacity of 425 kg (937 lb) of on-board propellant. With the propellant it carried, Dawn was able to perform a velocity change of approximately 11 km/s over the course of its mission, far more than any previous spacecraft achieved with onboard propellant after separation from its launch rocket. However, the thrust was very gentle; it took four days at full throttle to accelerate Dawn from zero to 60 mph (97 km/h). Dawn is NASA's first purely exploratory mission to use ion propulsion engines. The spacecraft also has twelve 0.9 N hydrazine thrusters for attitude control (orientation), which were also used to assist in orbital insertion.

The Dawn spacecraft was able to achieve a record-breaking level of propulsion from its ion engine. NASA noted three specific areas of excellence:

- First to orbit two different astronomical bodies (not including Earth)
- Solar-electric propulsion record, including a velocity change in space of 25,700 mph (11.5 km/s). This is 2.7 times the velocity change by solar-electric ion drive than the past record.
- Achieved 5.9 years of ion engine runtime by September 7, 2018. This amount of runtime equates to 54% of Dawn's time in outer space.

=== Outreach microchip ===
Dawn carries a memory chip bearing the names of more than 360,000 space enthusiasts. The names were submitted online as part of a public outreach effort between September 2005 and November 4, 2006. The microchip, which is two centimetres in diameter, was installed on May 17, 2007, above the spacecraft's forward ion thruster, underneath its high-gain antenna. More than one microchip was made, with a back-up copy put on display at the 2007 Open House event at the Jet Propulsion Laboratory in Pasadena, California.

== Mission summary ==
=== Launch preparations ===
On April 10, 2007, the spacecraft arrived at the Astrotech Space Operations subsidiary of SPACEHAB, Inc. in Titusville, Florida, where it was prepared for launch. The launch was originally scheduled for June 20, but was delayed until June 30 due to delays with part deliveries. A broken crane at the launch pad, used to raise the solid rocket boosters, further delayed the launch for a week, until July 7; prior to this, on June 15, the second stage was successfully hoisted into position. A mishap at the Astrotech Space Operations facility, involving slight damage to one of the solar arrays, did not have an effect on the launch date; however, bad weather caused the launch to slip to July 8. Range tracking problems then delayed the launch to July 9, and then July 15. Launch planning was then suspended in order to avoid conflicts with the Phoenix mission to Mars, which was successfully launched on August 4.

=== Launch ===
The launch of Dawn as seen per the YouTube video released on December 20, 2010 NASA's Kennedy Space Center.

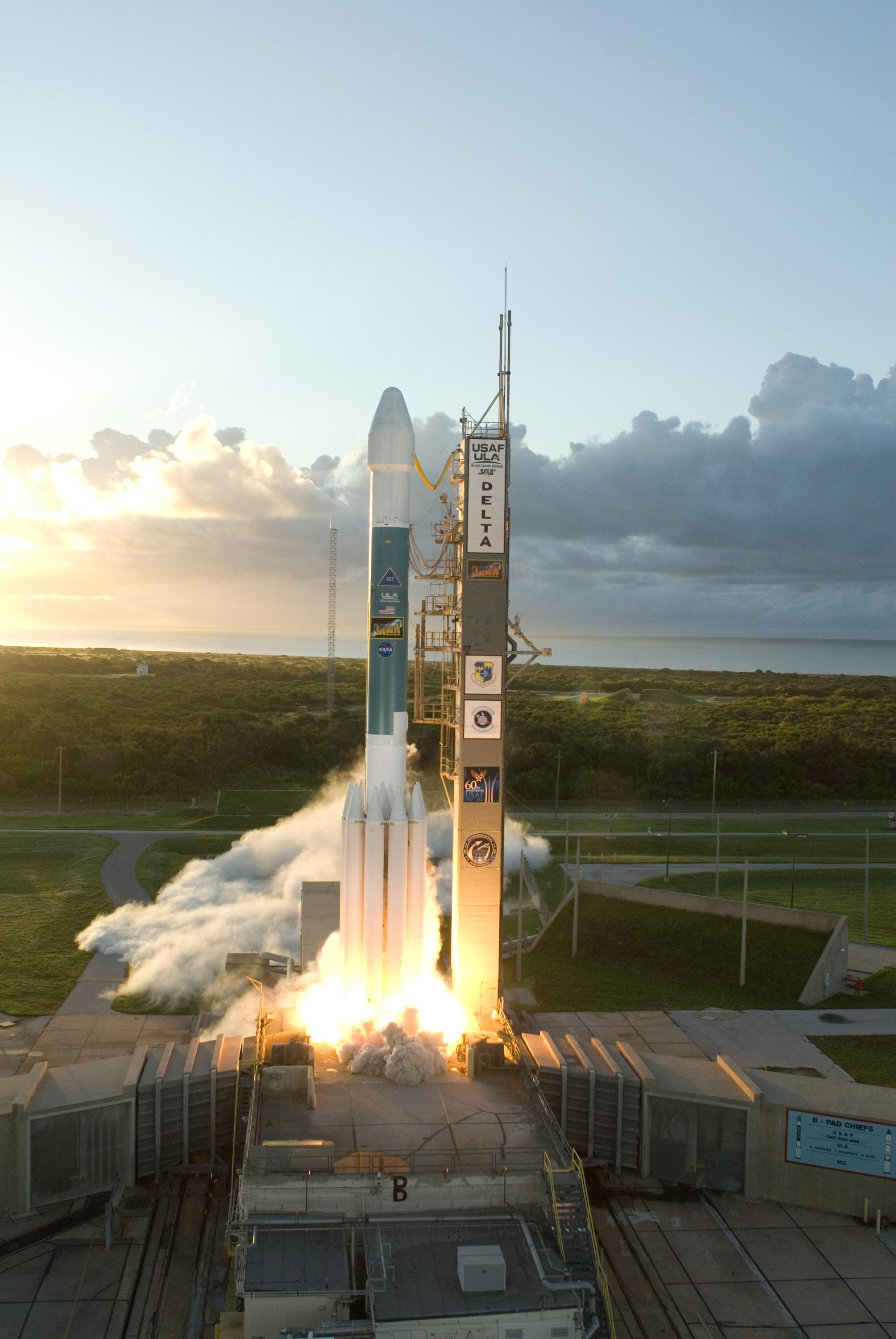
Dawn launching on a Delta II rocket from Cape Canaveral Air Force Station Space Launch Complex 17 on September 27, 2007

The launch of Dawn was rescheduled for September 26, 2007, then September 27, due to bad weather delaying fueling of the second stage, the same problem that delayed the July 7 launch attempt. The launch window extended from 07:20–07:49 EDY (11:20–14:49 GMT). During the final built-in hold at T−4 minutes, a ship entered the exclusion area offshore, the strip of ocean where the rocket boosters were likely to fall after separation. After commanding the ship to leave the area, the launch was required to wait for the end of a collision avoidance window with the International Space Station. Dawn finally launched from Space Launch Complex 17B at the Cape Canaveral Air Force Station on a Delta 7925-H rocket at 07:34 EDT, reaching escape velocity with the help of a spin-stabilized solid-fueled third stage. Thereafter, Dawn's ion thrusters took over.

=== Transit to Vesta ===
After initial testing, during which the ion thrusters accumulated more than 11 days 14 hours of operation, Dawn began long-term cruise propulsion on December 17, 2007. On October 31, 2008, Dawn completed its first thrusting phase to send it on to Mars for a gravity assist flyby in February 2009. During this first interplanetary cruise phase, Dawn spent 270 days, or 85% of this phase, using its thrusters. It expended less than 72 kilograms of xenon propellant for a total change in velocity of 1.81 km/s. On November 20, 2008, Dawn performed its first trajectory correction maneuver (TCM1), firing its number 1 thruster for 2 hours, 11 minutes.

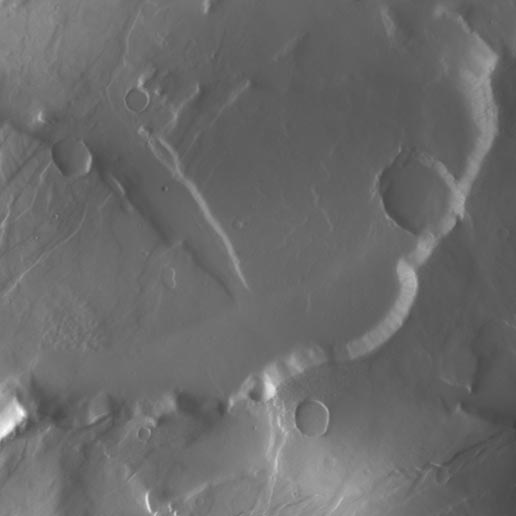
Greyscale NIR image of Mars (northwest Tempe Terra), taken by Dawn during its 2009 flyby

Dawn made its closest approach (549 km) to Mars on February 17, 2009, during a successful gravity assist. This flyby slowed Mars's orbital velocity by about 2.5 cm (1 in) per 180 million years. On this day, the spacecraft placed itself in safe mode, resulting in some data acquisition loss. The spacecraft was reported to be back in full operation two days later, with no impact on the subsequent mission identified. The root cause of the event was reported to be a software programming error.

To cruise from Earth to its targets, Dawn travelled in an elongated outward spiral trajectory. The summarized Vesta and Ceres timelines:

- September 27, 2007: launch
- February 17, 2009: Mars gravity assist
- July 16, 2011: Vesta arrival and capture
- August 11–31, 2011: Vesta survey orbit
- September 29 – November 2, 2011: Vesta first high altitude orbit
- December 12, 2011 – May 1, 2012: Vesta low altitude orbit
- June 15 – July 25, 2012: Vesta second high altitude orbit
- September 5, 2012: Vesta departure
- March 6, 2015: Ceres arrival
- June 30, 2016: End of primary Ceres operations
- July 1, 2016: Beginning of Ceres extended mission
- November 1, 2018: End of mission due to fuel exhaustion

=== Vesta approach ===
As Dawn approached Vesta, the Framing Camera instrument took progressively higher-resolution images, which were published online and at news conferences by NASA and MPI.

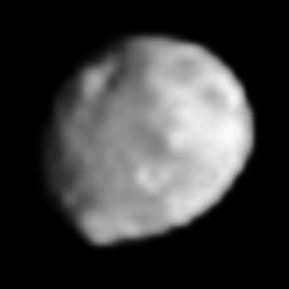
June 14, 2011
265,000 km (165,000 mi)

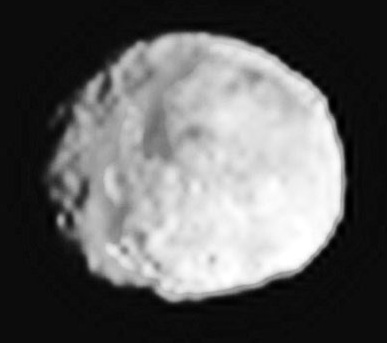
June 24, 2011
152,000 km (94,000 mi)

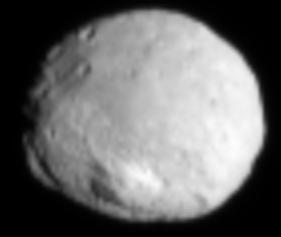
July 1, 2011
100,000 km (62,000 mi)

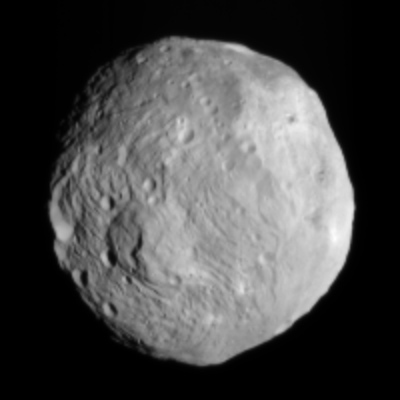
July 9, 2011
41,000 km (25,000 mi)

On May 3, 2011, Dawn acquired its first targeting image, 1,200,000 km from Vesta, and began its approach phase to the asteroid. On June 12, Dawn's speed relative to Vesta was slowed in preparation for its orbital insertion 34 days later.

Dawn was scheduled to be inserted into orbit at 05:00 UTC on July 16 after a period of thrusting with its ion engines. Because its antenna was pointed away from the Earth during thrusting, scientists were not able to immediately confirm whether or not Dawn successfully made the maneuver. The spacecraft would then reorient itself, and was scheduled to check in at 06:30 UTC on July 17. NASA later confirmed that it received telemetry from Dawn indicating that the spacecraft successfully entered orbit around Vesta, making it the first spacecraft to orbit an object in the asteroid belt. The exact time of insertion could not be confirmed, since it depended on Vesta's mass distribution, which was not precisely known and at that time had only been estimated.

=== Vesta orbit ===
After being captured by Vesta's gravity and entering its orbit on July 16, 2011, Dawn moved to a lower, closer orbit by running its xenon-ion engine using solar power. On August 2, it paused its spiralling approach to enter a 69-hour survey orbit at an altitude of 2,750 km (1,710 mi). It assumed a 12.3-hour high-altitude mapping orbit at 680 km (420 mi) on September 27, and finally entered a 4.3-hour low-altitude mapping orbit at 210 km (130 mi) on December 8.

Animation of Dawn's trajectory around 4 Vesta from July 15, 2011, to September 10, 2012 Dawn · 4 Vesta

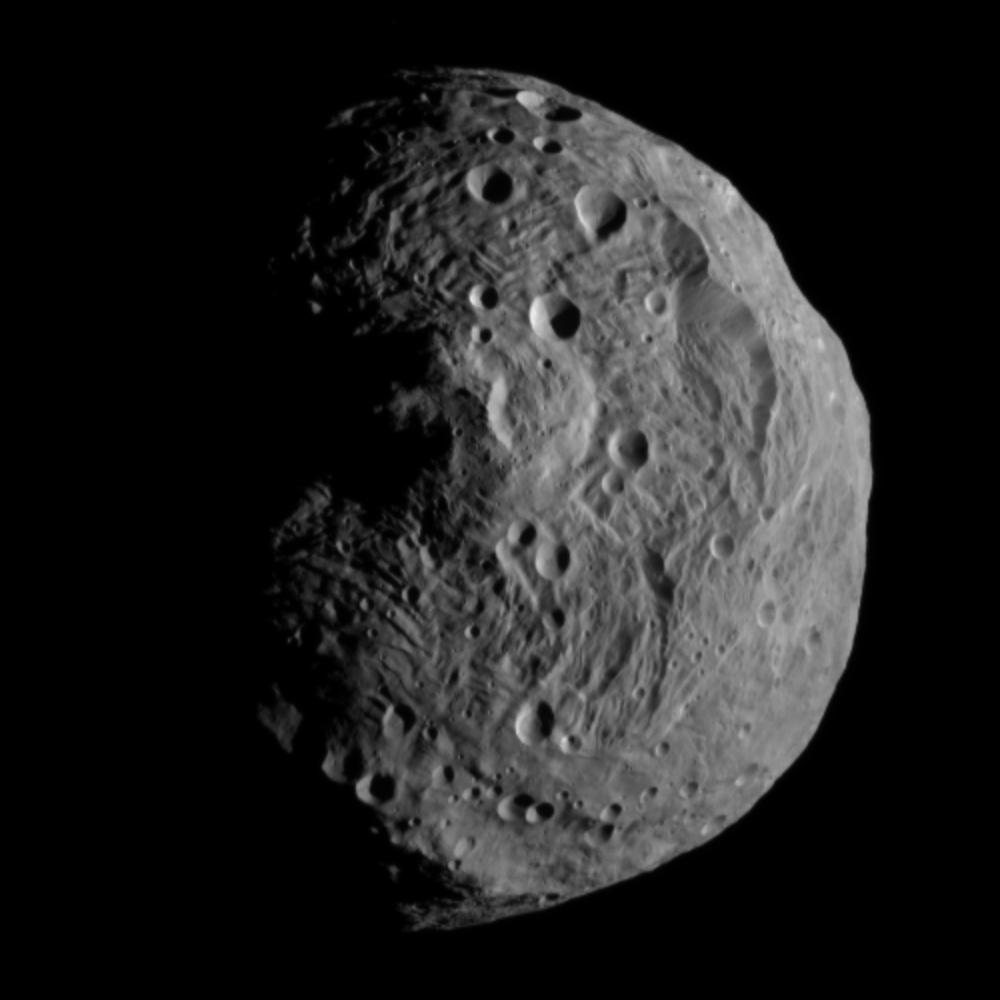
July 17, 2011
16,000 km (9,900 mi)

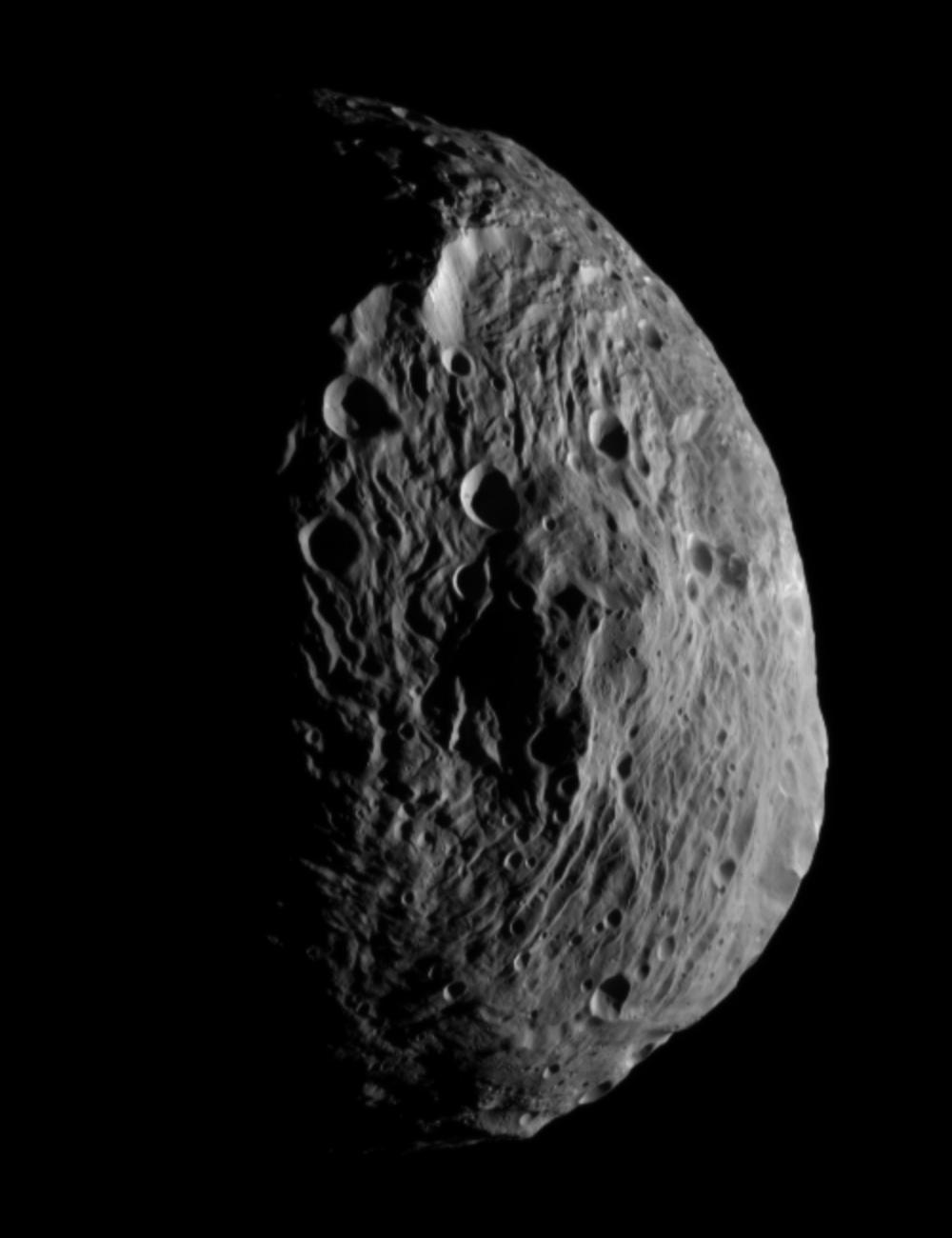
July 18, 2011
10,500 km (6,500 mi)

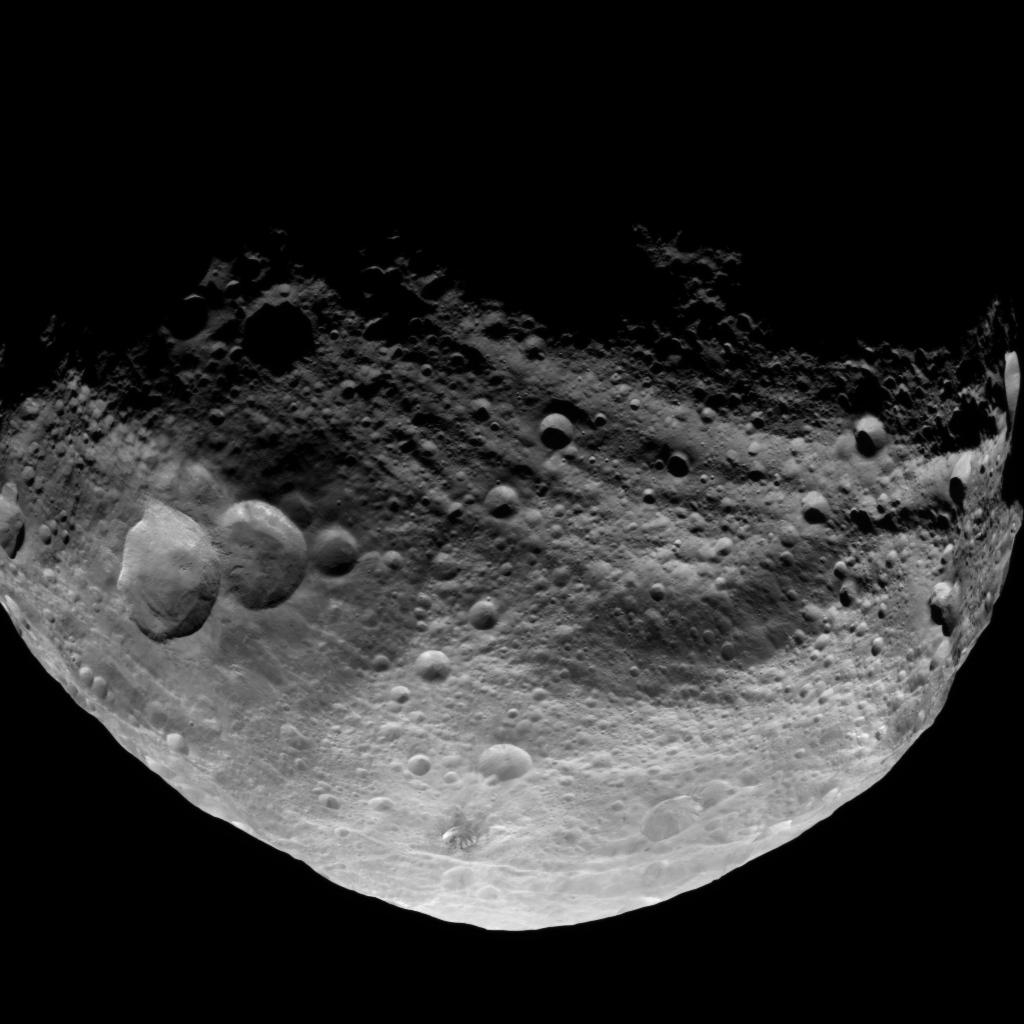
July 23, 2011
5,200 km (3,200 mi)

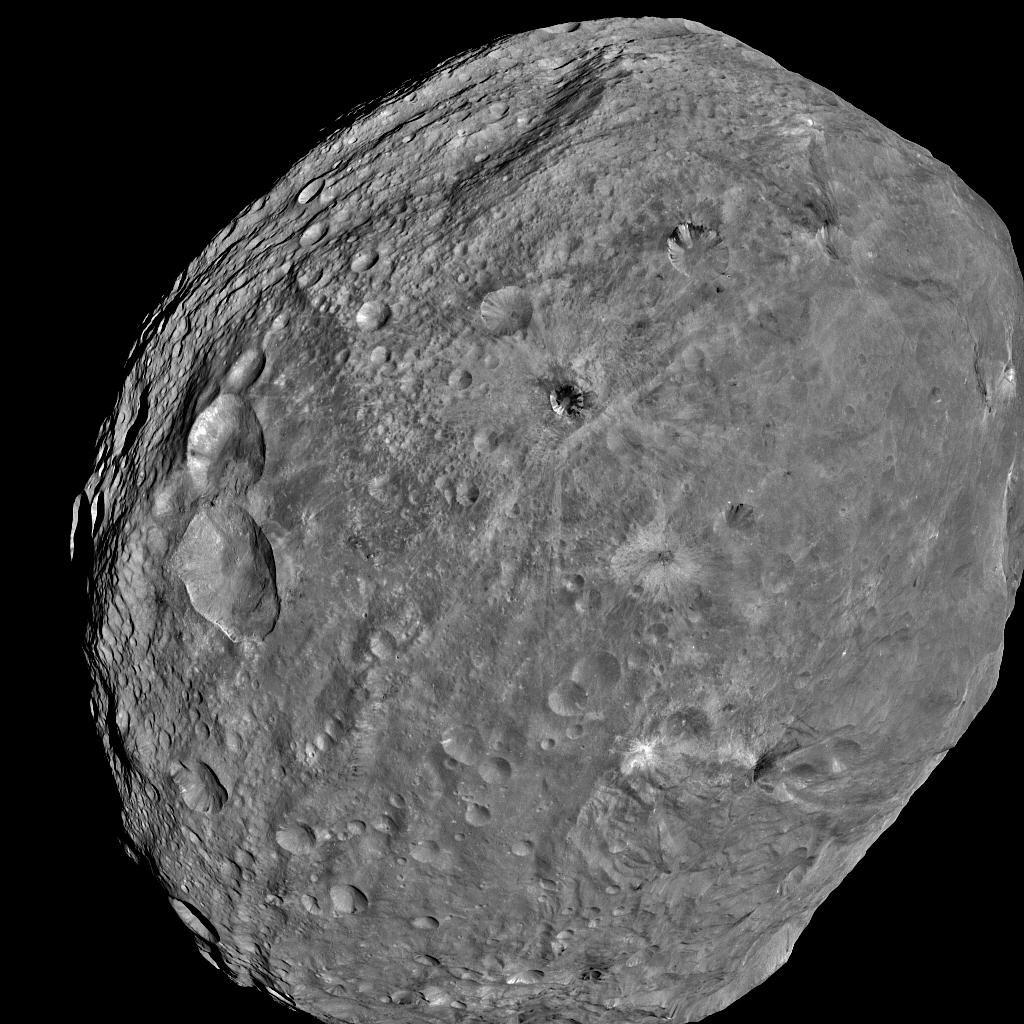
July 24, 2011
5,200 km (3,200 mi)

In May 2012, the Dawn team published preliminary results of their study of Vesta, including estimates of the size of Vesta's metal-rich core, which is theorized to be 220 km (140 mi) across. The scientists stated that they think that Vesta is the "last of its kind" – the only remaining example of the large planetesimals that came together to form the rocky planets during the formation of the Solar System. In October 2012, further Dawn results were published, on the origin of anomalous dark spots and streaks on Vesta's surface, which were likely deposited by ancient asteroid impacts. In December 2012, it was reported that Dawn had observed gullies on the surface of Vesta that were interpreted to have been eroded by transiently flowing liquid water. More details about the Dawn mission's scientific discoveries at Vesta are included on the Vesta page.

Dawn was originally scheduled to depart Vesta and begin its two and a half year journey to Ceres on August 26, 2012. However, a problem with one of the spacecraft's reaction wheels forced Dawn to delay its departure from Vesta's gravity until September 5, 2012.

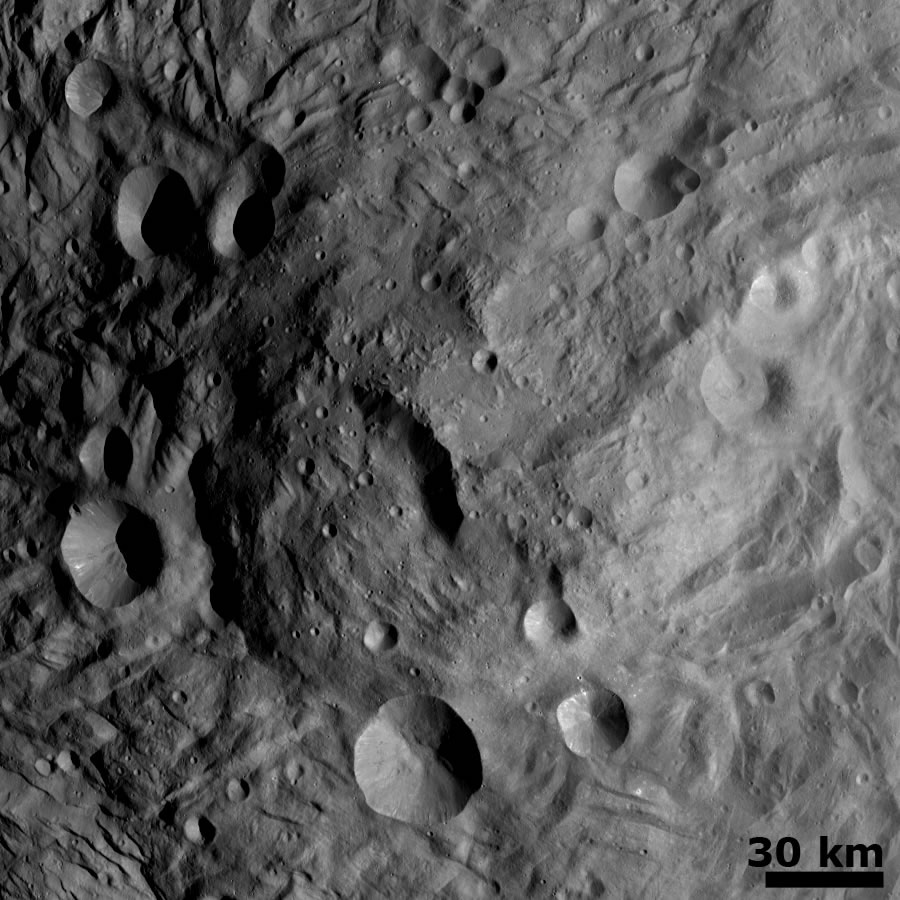
Central Mound at the South Pole on the asteroid Vesta on August 12, 2011

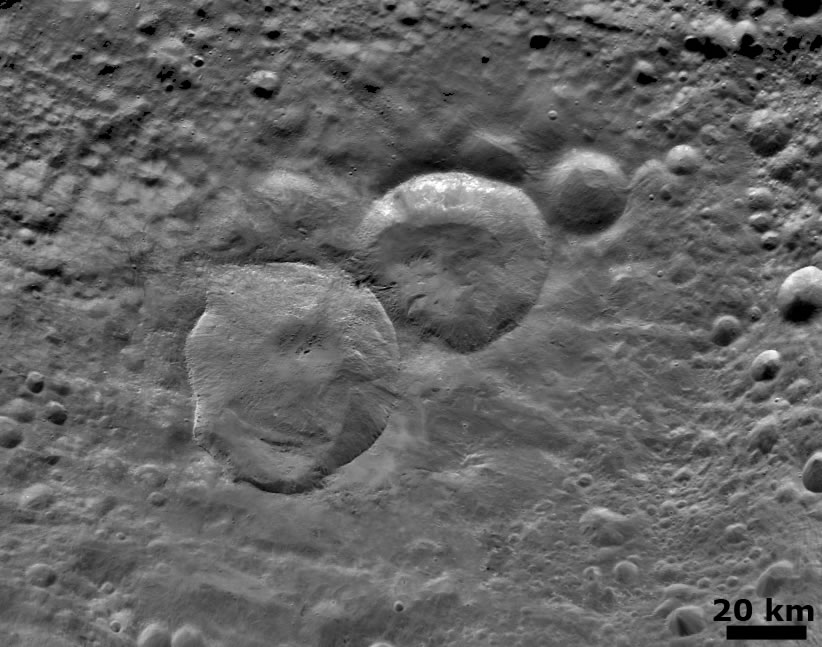
The snowman shaped craters on Vesta

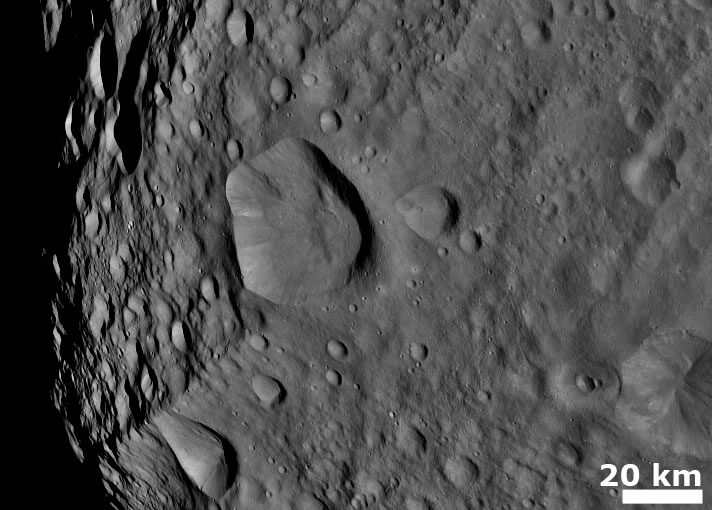
Craters and ridges of Vesta

Geologic map of Vesta based on Dawn data
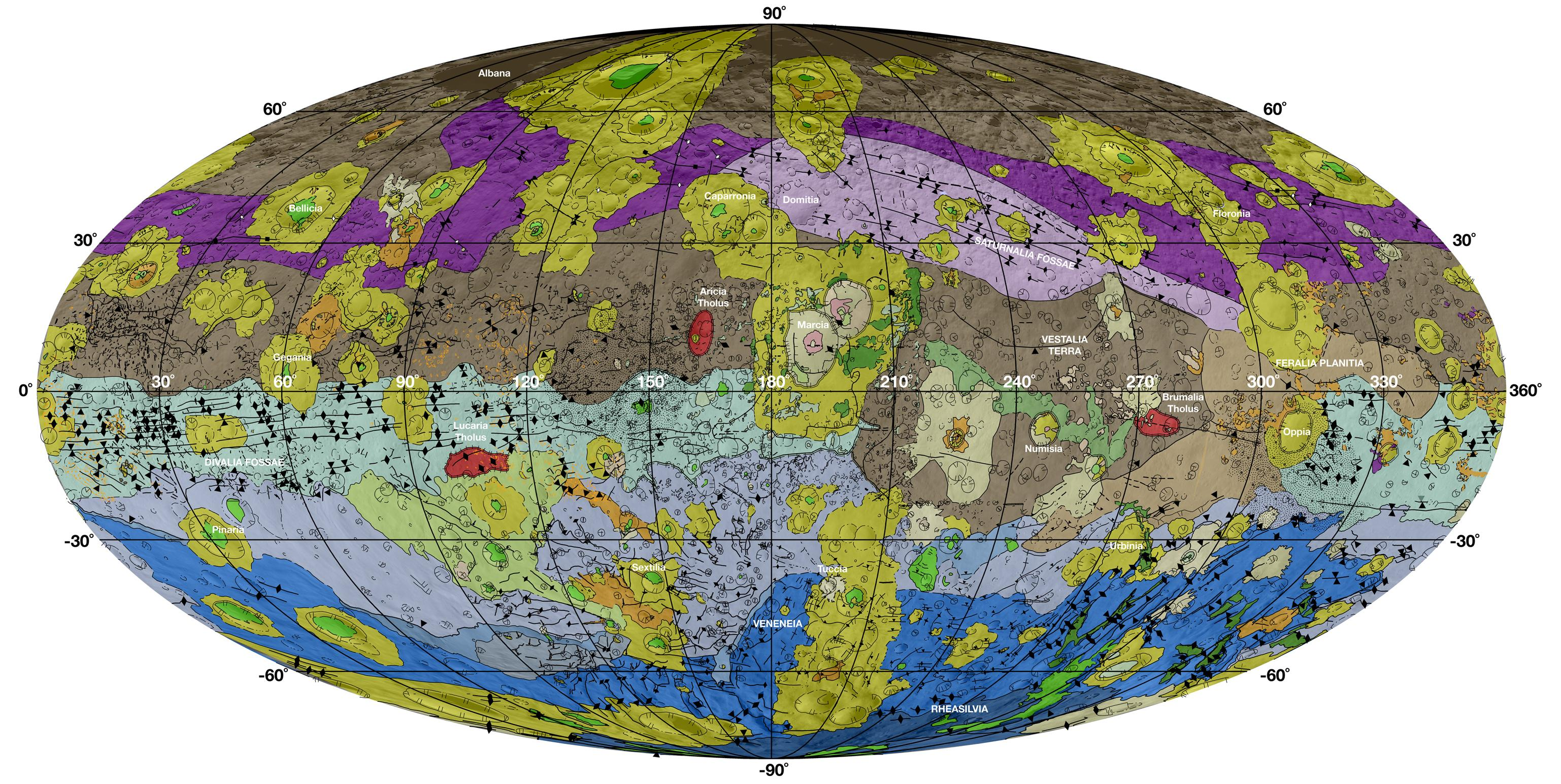

The most ancient and heavily cratered regions are brown; areas modified by the Veneneia and Rheasilvia impacts are purple (the Saturnalia Fossae Formation, in the north) and light cyan (the Divalia Fossae Formation, equatorial), respectively; the Rheasilvia impact basin interior (in the south) is dark blue, and neighboring areas of Rheasilvia ejecta (including an area within Veneneia) are light purple-blue; areas modified by more recent impacts or mass wasting are yellow/orange or green, respectively.

=== Transit to Ceres ===
Imaging dates (2014–2015) and resolution
Date	distance (km)	diameter (px)	resolution (km/px)	portion of disk illuminated
December 1	1,200,000	9	112	94%
January 13	383,000	27	36	95%
January 25	237,000	43	22	96%
February 3	146,000	70	14	97%
February 12	83,000	122	7.8	98%
February 19	46,000	222	4.3	87%
February 25	40,000	255	3.7	44%
March 1	49,000	207	4.6	23%
April 10	33,000	306	3.1	17%
April 15	22,000	453	2.1	49%

During its time in orbit around Vesta, the probe experienced several failures of its reaction wheels. Investigators planned to modify their activities upon arrival at Ceres for close range geographical survey mapping. The Dawn team stated that they would orient the probe using a "hybrid" mode utilizing both reaction wheels and ion thrusters. Engineers determined that this hybrid mode would conserve fuel. On November 13, 2013, during the transit, in a test preparation, Dawn engineers completed a 27-hour-long series of exercises of said hybrid mode.

On September 11, 2014, Dawn's ion thruster unexpectedly ceased firing and the probe began operating in a triggered safe mode. To avoid a lapse in propulsion, the mission team hastily exchanged the active ion engine and electrical controller with another. The team stated that they had a plan in place to revive this disabled component later in 2014. The controller in the ion propulsion system may have been damaged by a high-energy particle. Upon exiting the safe mode on September 15, 2014, the probe's ion thruster resumed normal operation.

Furthermore, the Dawn investigators also found that, after the propulsion issue, Dawn could not aim its main communications antenna towards Earth. Another antenna of weaker capacity was instead temporarily retasked. To correct the problem, the probe's computer was reset and the aiming mechanism of the main antenna was restored.

=== Ceres approach ===
Dawn began photographing an extended disk of Ceres on December 1, 2014, with images of partial rotations on January 13 and 25, 2015 released as animations. Images taken from Dawn of Ceres after January 26, 2015, exceeded the resolution of comparable images from the Hubble Space Telescope.

Progression of images of Ceres taken by Dawn between January and March 2015
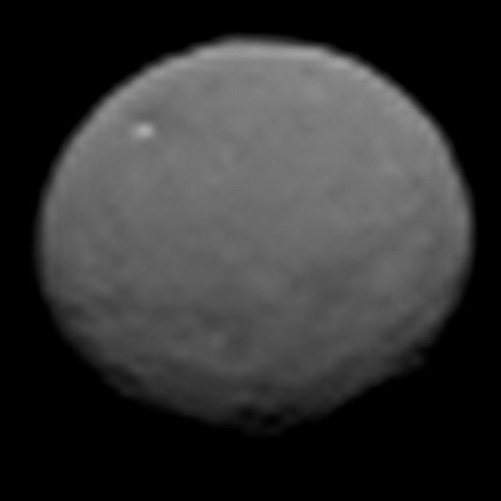
January 25, 2015
237,000 km (147,000 mi)

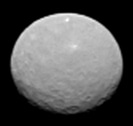
February 4, 2015
145,000 km (90,000 mi)

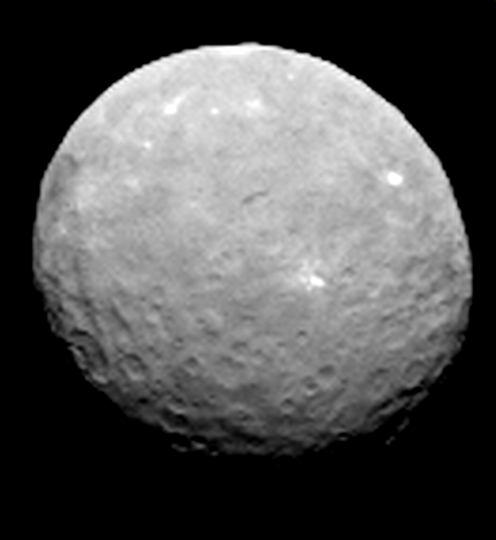
February 12, 2015
80,000 km (50,000 mi)

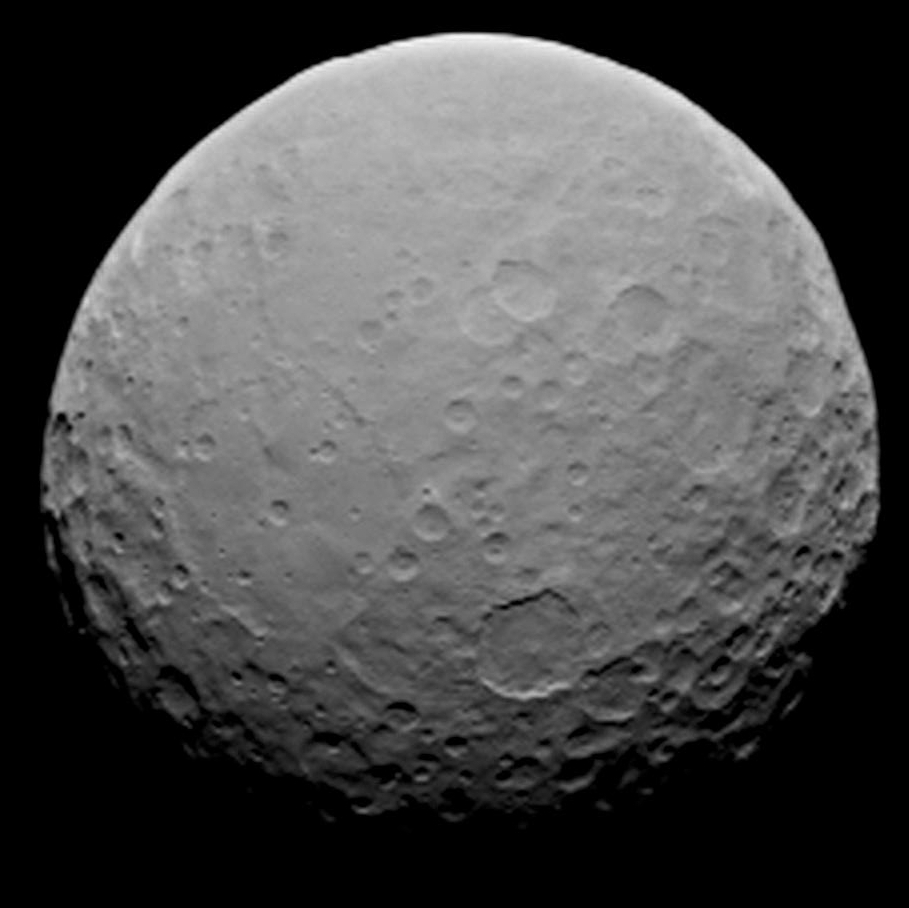
February 19, 2015
46,000 km (29,000 mi)

Because of the failure of two reaction wheels, Dawn made fewer camera observations of Ceres during its approach phase than it did during its Vesta approach. Camera observations required turning the spacecraft, which consumed precious hydrazine fuel. Seven optical navigation photo sessions (OpNav 1–7, on January 13 and 25, February 3 and 25, March 1, and April 10 and 15) and two full rotation observation sessions (RC1–2, on February 12 and 19) were planned before full observation begins with orbital capture. The gap in March and early April was due to a period when Ceres appears too close to the Sun from Dawn's vantage point to take pictures safely.

=== Ceres orbit ===
Animation of Dawn's trajectory around Ceres from February 1, 2015, to February 1, 2025 Dawn · Ceres

Mapping orbits and resolution – Photos of Ceres by Dawn on Commons
Orbit phase	No.	Dates	Altitude (km; mi)	Orbital period	Resolution (km/px)	Improvement over Hubble	Notes
RC3	1st	April 23 – May 9, 2015	13,500 km (8,400 mi)	15 days	1.3	24×	
Survey	2nd	June 6–30, 2015	4,400 km (2,700 mi)	3.1 days	0.41	73×	
HAMO	3rd	August 17 – October 23, 2015	1,450 km (900 mi)	19 hours	0.14 (140 m)	217×	
LAMO/XMO1	4th	December 16, 2015 – September 2, 2016	375 km (233 mi)	5.5 hours	0.035 (35 m)	850×	
XMO2	5th	October 5 – November 4, 2016	1,480 km (920 mi)	19 hours	0.14 (140 m)	217×	
XMO3	6th	December 5, 2016 – February 22, 2017	7,520–9,350 km (4,670–5,810 mi)	≈8 days	0.9 (est)	34× (est)	
XMO4	7th	April 22 – June 22, 2017	13,830–52,800 km (8,590–32,810 mi)	≈29 days			
XMO5	8th	June 30, 2017 – April 16, 2018	4,400–39,100 km (2,700–24,300 mi)	30 days			
XMO6	9th	May 14–31, 2018	440–4,700 km (270–2,920 mi)	37 hours			
XMO7 (FINAL)	10th	June 6, 2018 – present	35–4,000 km (22–2,485 mi)	27.2 hours			

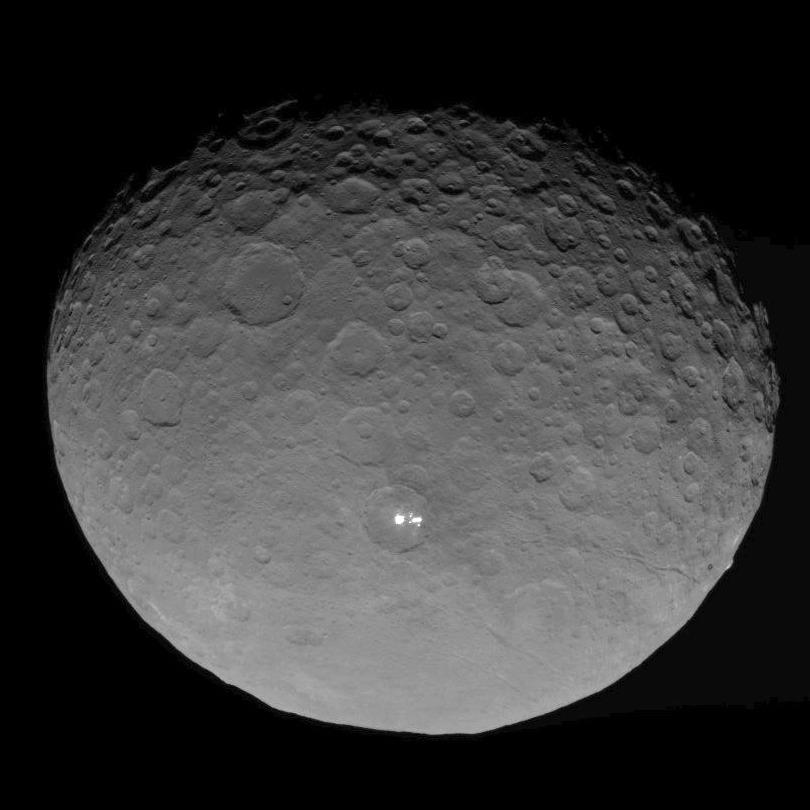
April 23, 2015
1st Map Orbit – RC3
13,600 km (8,500 mi)
(view on commons)

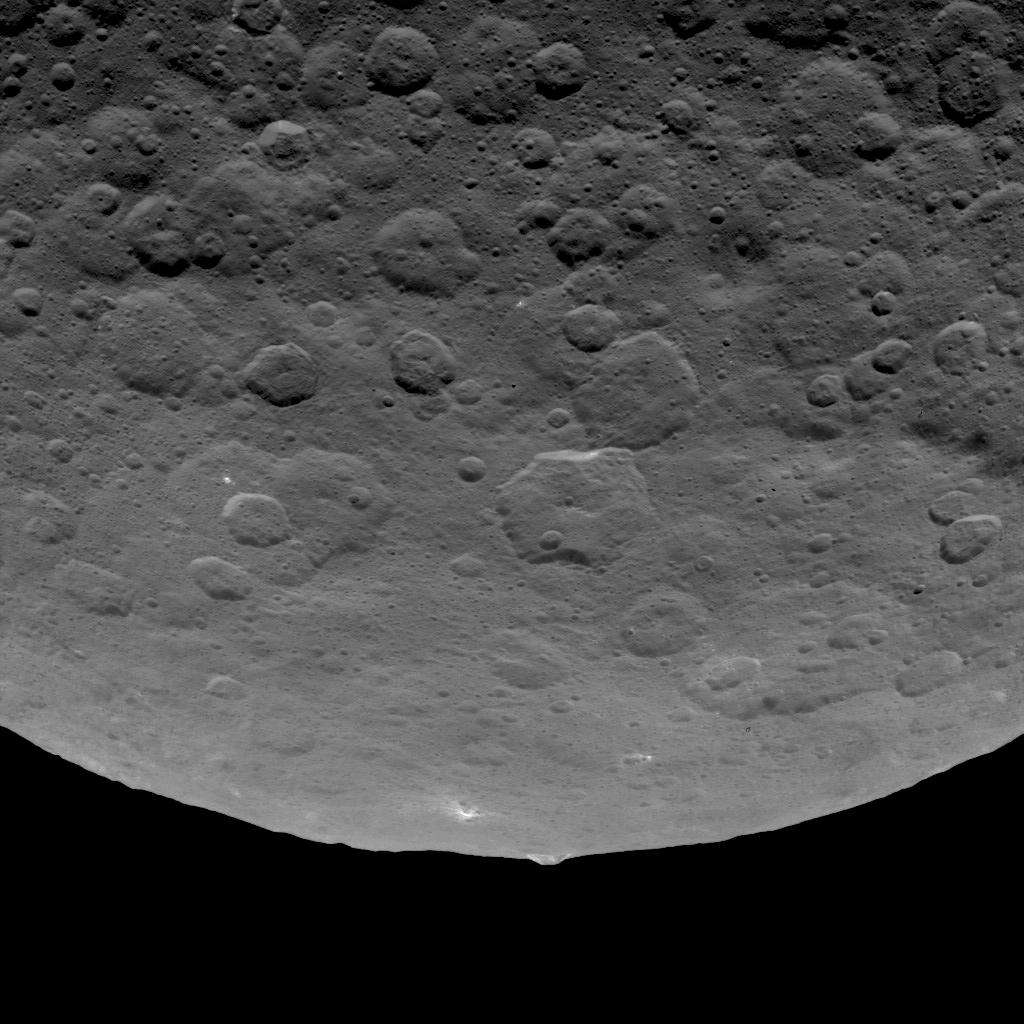
June 6, 2015
2nd Map Orbit – SRVY
4,400 km (2,700 mi)
(view on commons)

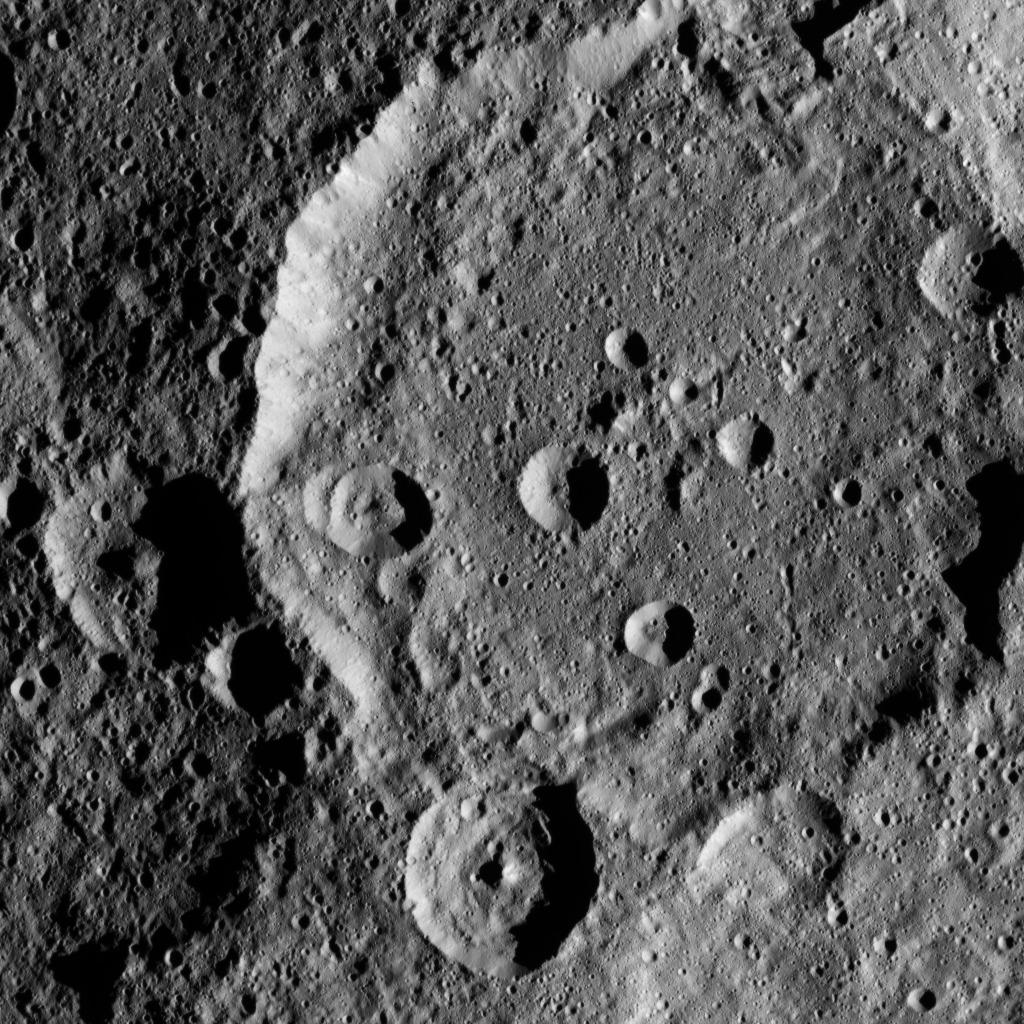
August 17, 2015
3rd Map Orbit – HAMO
1,470 km (915 mi)
(view on commons)

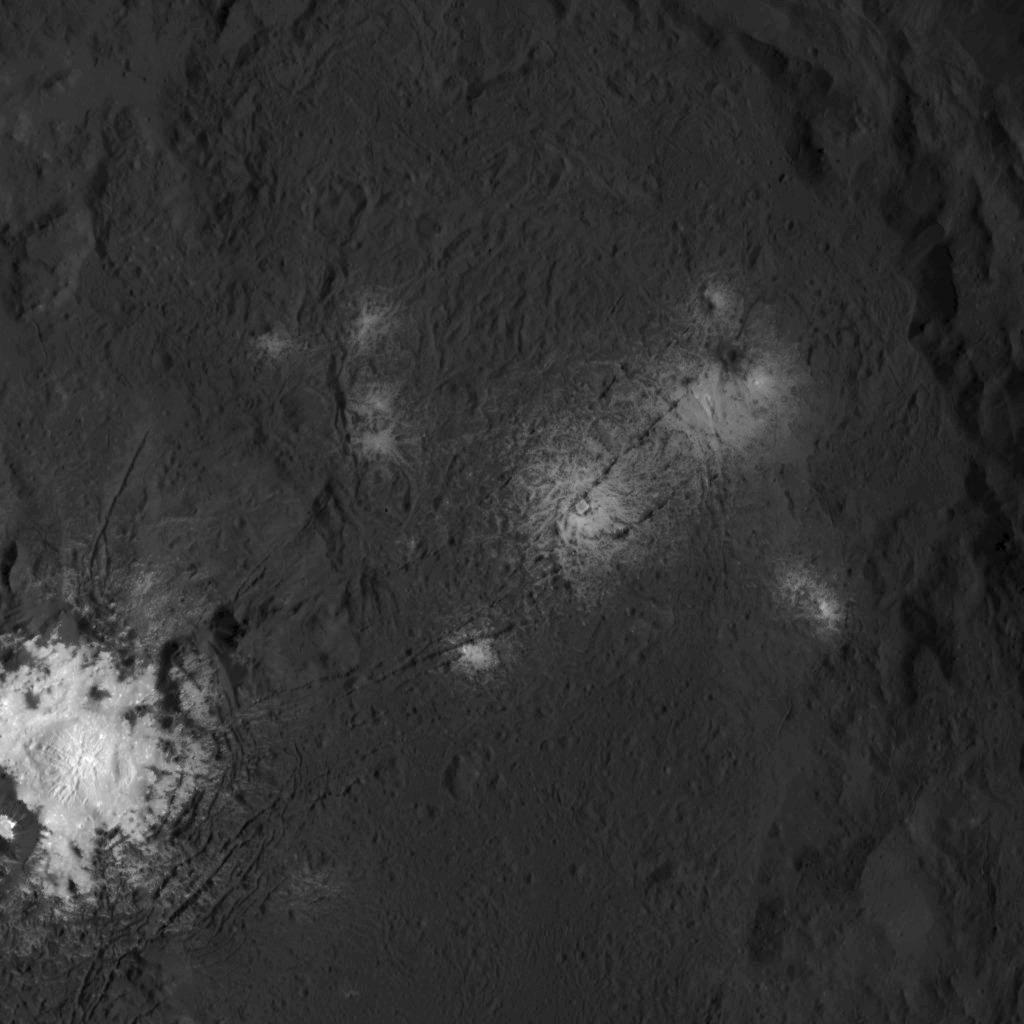
December 10, 2015
4th Map Orbit – LAMO
385 km (240 mi)
(view on commons)

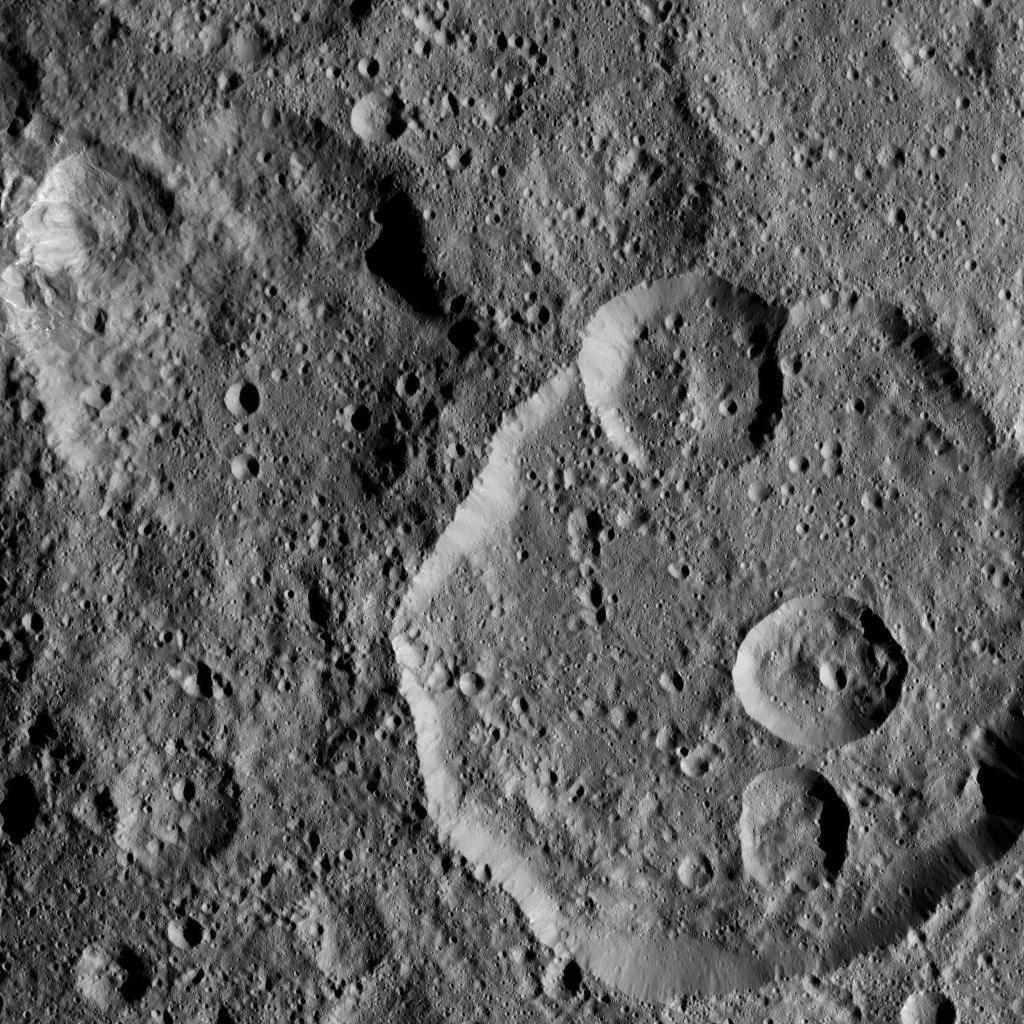
October 5, 2016
5th Map Orbit – XMO2
1,480 km (920 mi)
(view on commons)

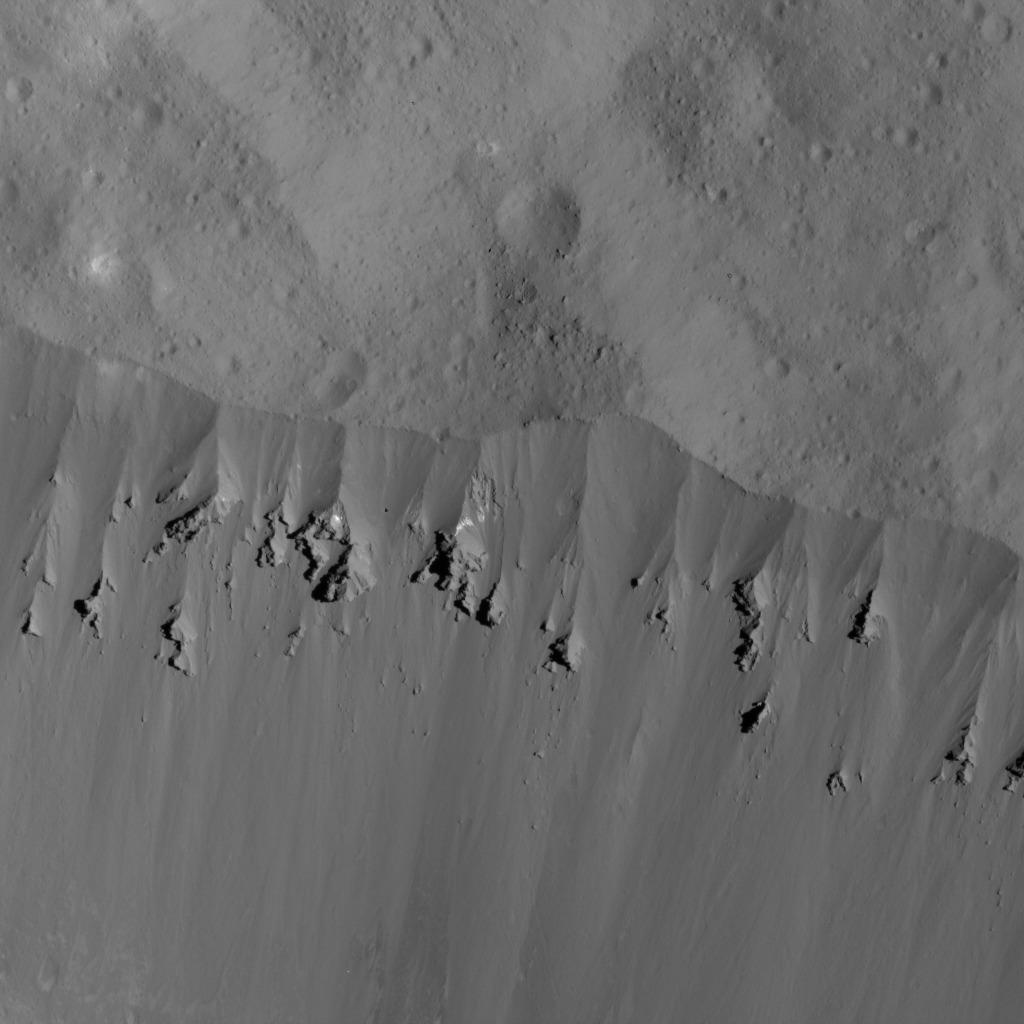
June 9, 2018
10th Map Orbit – XMO7
35 km (22 mi)
(view on commons)

Dawn entered Ceres orbit on March 6, 2015, four months prior to the arrival of New Horizons at Pluto. Dawn thus became the first mission to study a dwarf planet at close range. Dawn initially entered a polar orbit around Ceres, and continued to refine its orbit. It obtained its first full topographic map of Ceres during this period.

From April 23 to May 9, 2015, Dawn entered an RC3 orbit (Rotation Characterization 3) at an altitude of 13,500 km (8,400 mi). The RC3 orbit lasted 15 days, during which Dawn alternated taking pictures and sensor measurements and then relayed the resulting data back to Earth. On May 9, 2015, Dawn powered its ion engines and began a month-long spiral descent down to its second mapping point, a Survey orbit, three times closer to Ceres than the previous orbit. The spacecraft stopped twice to take images of Ceres during its spiral descent into the new orbit.

On June 6, 2015, Dawn entered the new Survey orbit at an altitude of 4,430 km (2,750 mi). In the new Survey orbit, Dawn circled Ceres every three Earth days. The Survey phase lasted 22 days (7 orbits), and was designed to obtain a global view of Ceres with Dawn's framing camera, and generate detailed global maps with the visible and infrared mapping spectrometer (VIR).

On June 30, 2015, Dawn experienced a software glitch when an anomaly in its orientation system occurred. It responded by going into safe mode and sending a signal to engineers, who fixed the error on July 2, 2015. Engineers determined the cause of the anomaly to be related to the mechanical gimbal system associated with one of Dawn's ion engines. After switching to a separate ion engine and conducting tests from July 14 through July 16, 2015, engineers certified the ability to continue the mission.

On August 17, 2015, Dawn entered the HAMO orbit (High-Altitude Mapping Orbit). Dawn descended to an altitude of 1,480 km (920 mi), where in August 2015 it began the two-month HAMO phase. During this phase, Dawn continued to acquire near-global maps with the VIR and framing camera at higher resolution than in the Survey phase. It also imaged in stereo to resolve the surface in 3D.

On October 23, 2015, Dawn began a two-month spiral toward Ceres to achieve a LAMO orbit (Low-Altitude Mapping Orbit) at a distance of 375 km (233 mi). Since reaching this fourth orbit in December 2015, Dawn was scheduled to acquire data for the next three months with its gamma-ray and neutron detector (GRaND) and other instruments that identified the composition at the surface.

Having surpassed its mapping objectives, Dawn climbed to its fifth science orbit of 1,460 km (910 mi) beginning on September 2, 2016, to complete additional observations from a different angle. Dawn began raising its altitude to its sixth science orbit of 7,200 km (4,500 mi) on November 4, 2016, with a goal of reaching it by December 2016. The return to a higher altitude allowed for a second set of data at this altitude, which improves the overall science quality when added to the first batch. However, this time the spacecraft was placed where it was not spiraling and was orbiting in the same direction as Ceres, which reduced propellant consumption.

== Mission conclusion ==
A flyby of the asteroid 2 Pallas after the completion of the Ceres mission was suggested but never formally considered; orbiting Pallas would not have been possible for Dawn due to the high inclination of Pallas's orbit relative to Ceres.

In April 2016, the Dawn project team submitted a proposal to NASA for an extended mission that would have seen the spacecraft break orbit from Ceres and perform a flyby of the asteroid 145 Adeona in May 2019, arguing that the science gained from visiting a third asteroid might outweigh the returns from staying at Ceres. NASA's Planetary Mission Senior Review Panel, however, declined the proposal in May 2016. A one-year mission extension was approved, but the review panel ordered that Dawn remain at Ceres, stating that the long-term observations of the dwarf planet, particularly as it approached perihelion, would potentially yield better science.

The one-year extension expired on June 30, 2017. The spacecraft was placed in an uncontrolled but relatively stable orbit around Ceres, where it ran out of hydrazine propellant by October 31, 2018, and where it will remain as a "monument" for at least 20 years.

Ceres – some of the last views by the Dawn spacecraft (September 1, 2018)

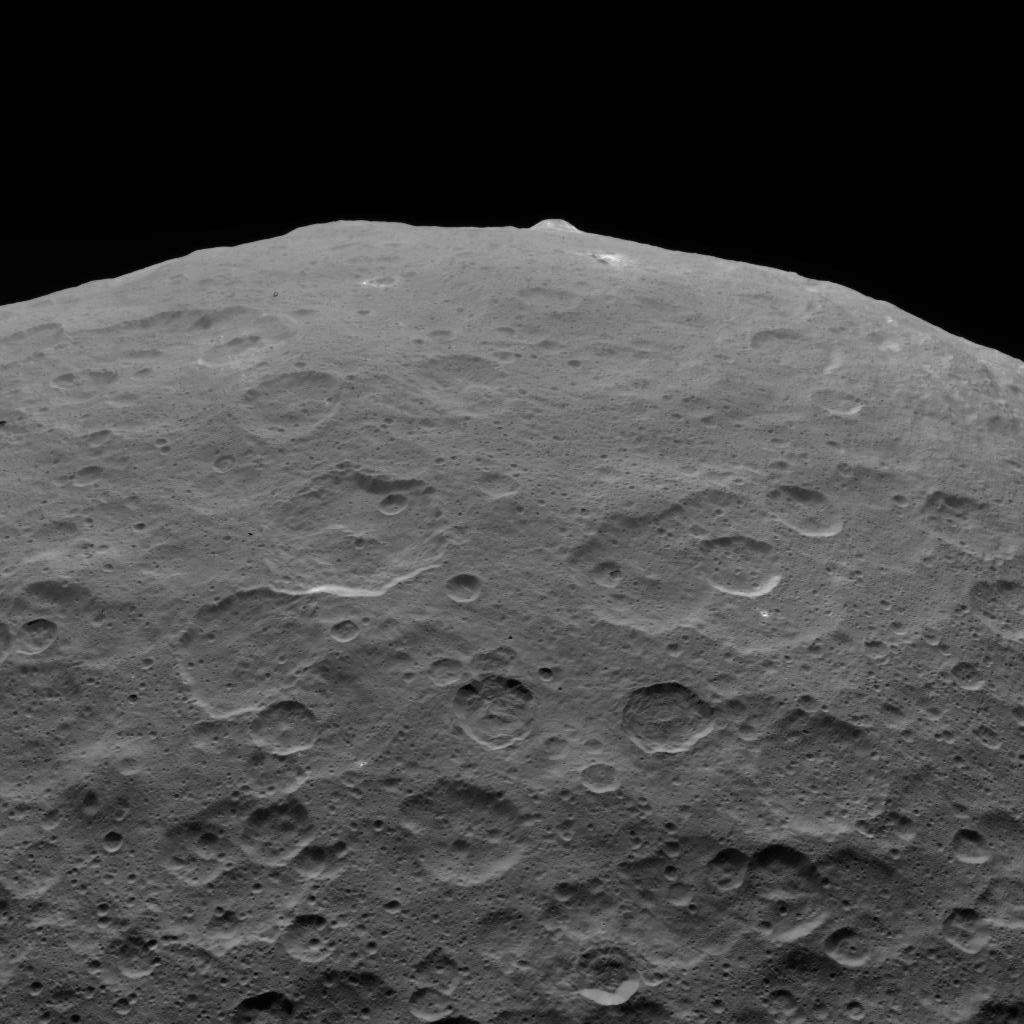
Ahuna Mons

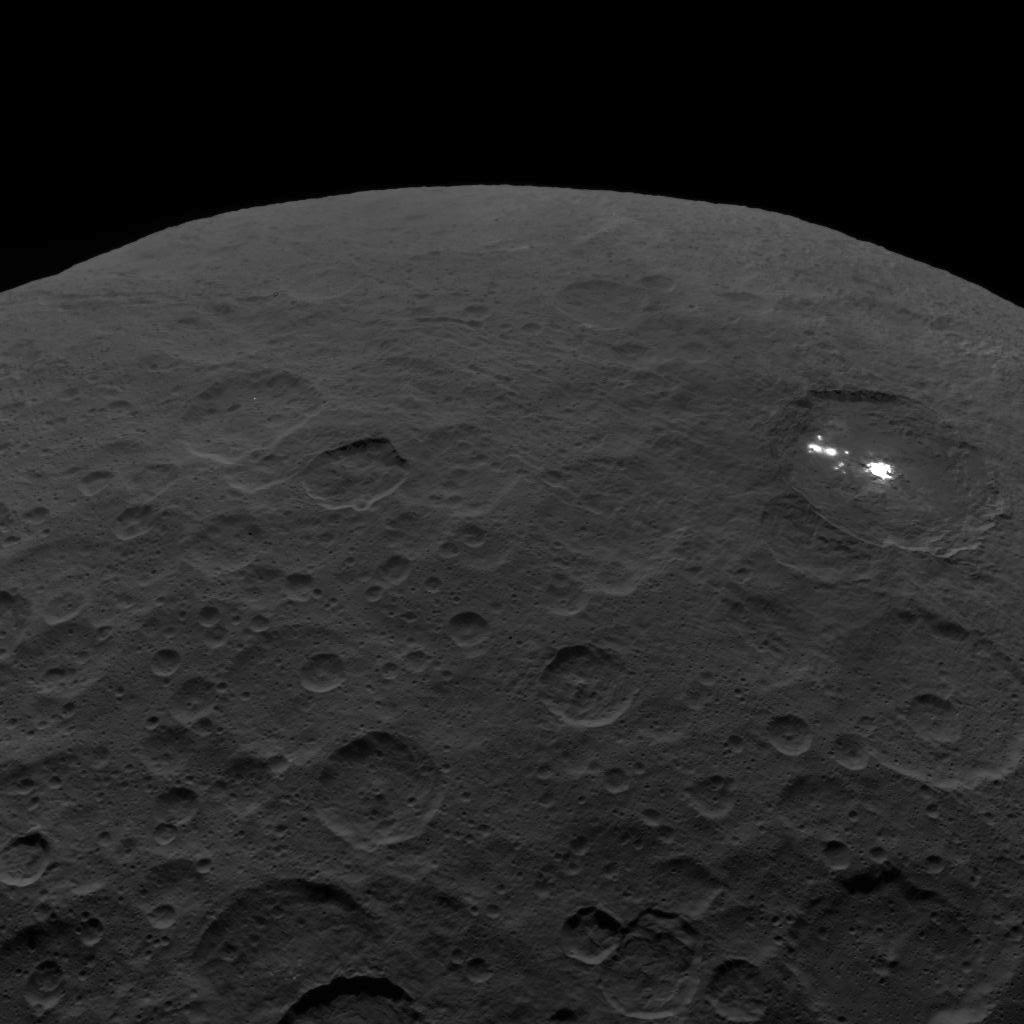
Occator Crater

== Media ==
=== High-resolution image ===
High-resolution view of Ceres taken during its low-altitude mapping orbit

=== Ceres atlas images ===
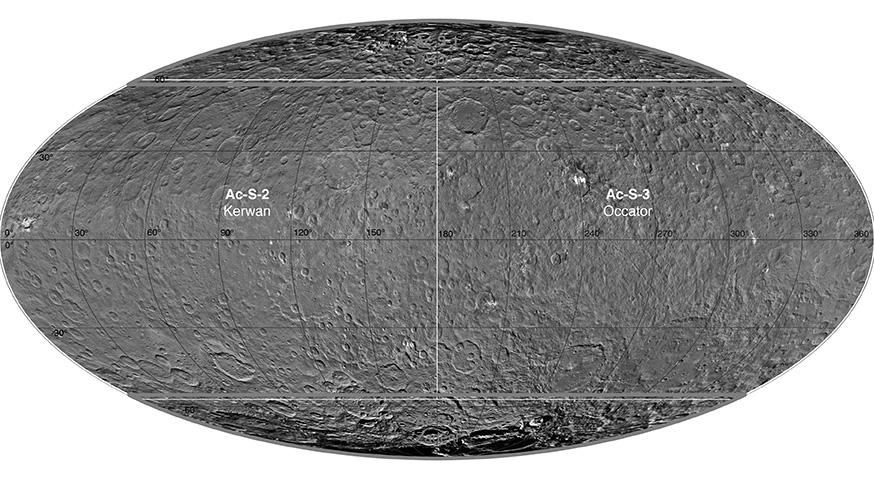
Overall

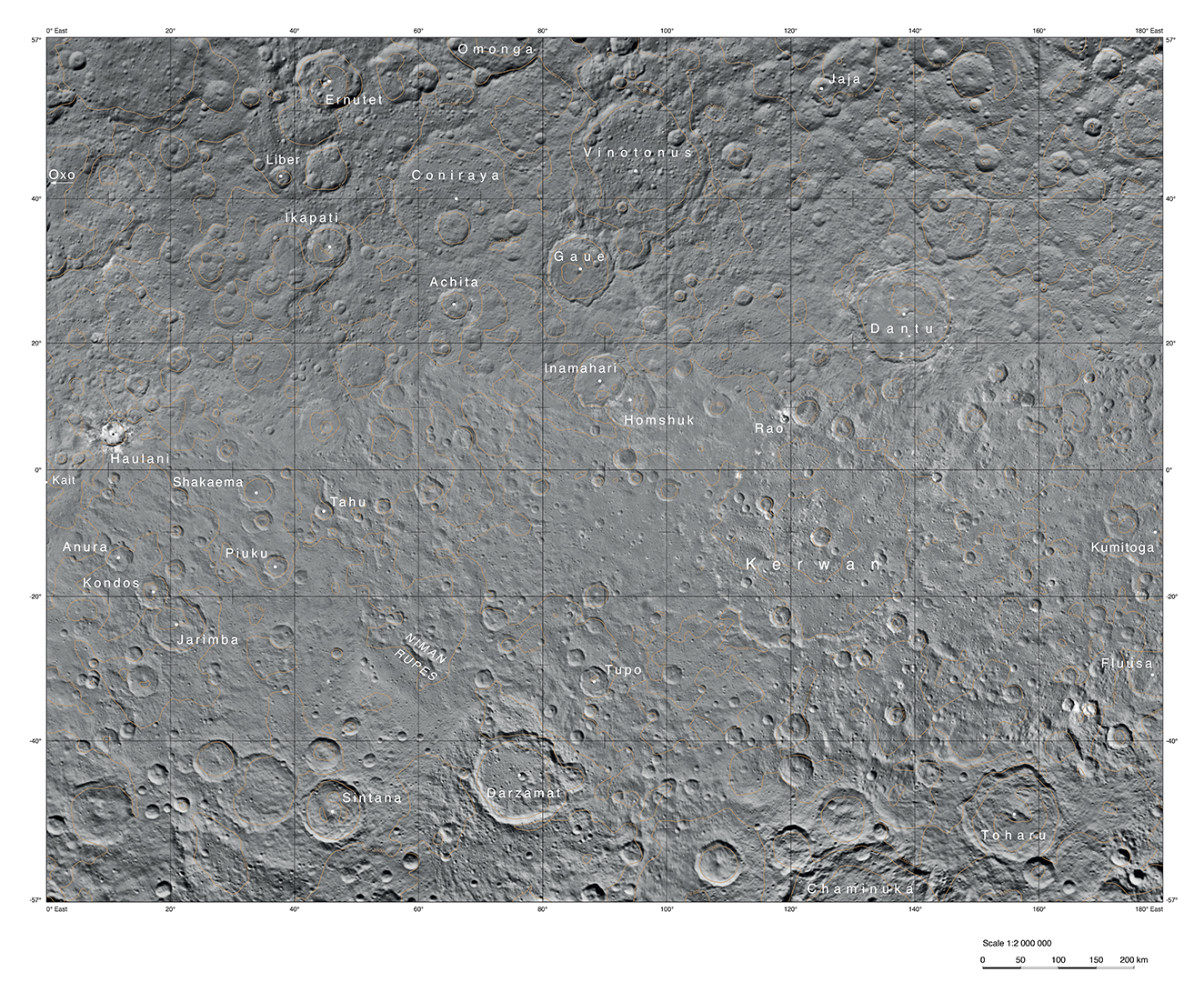
Kerwan section
(PDF version)

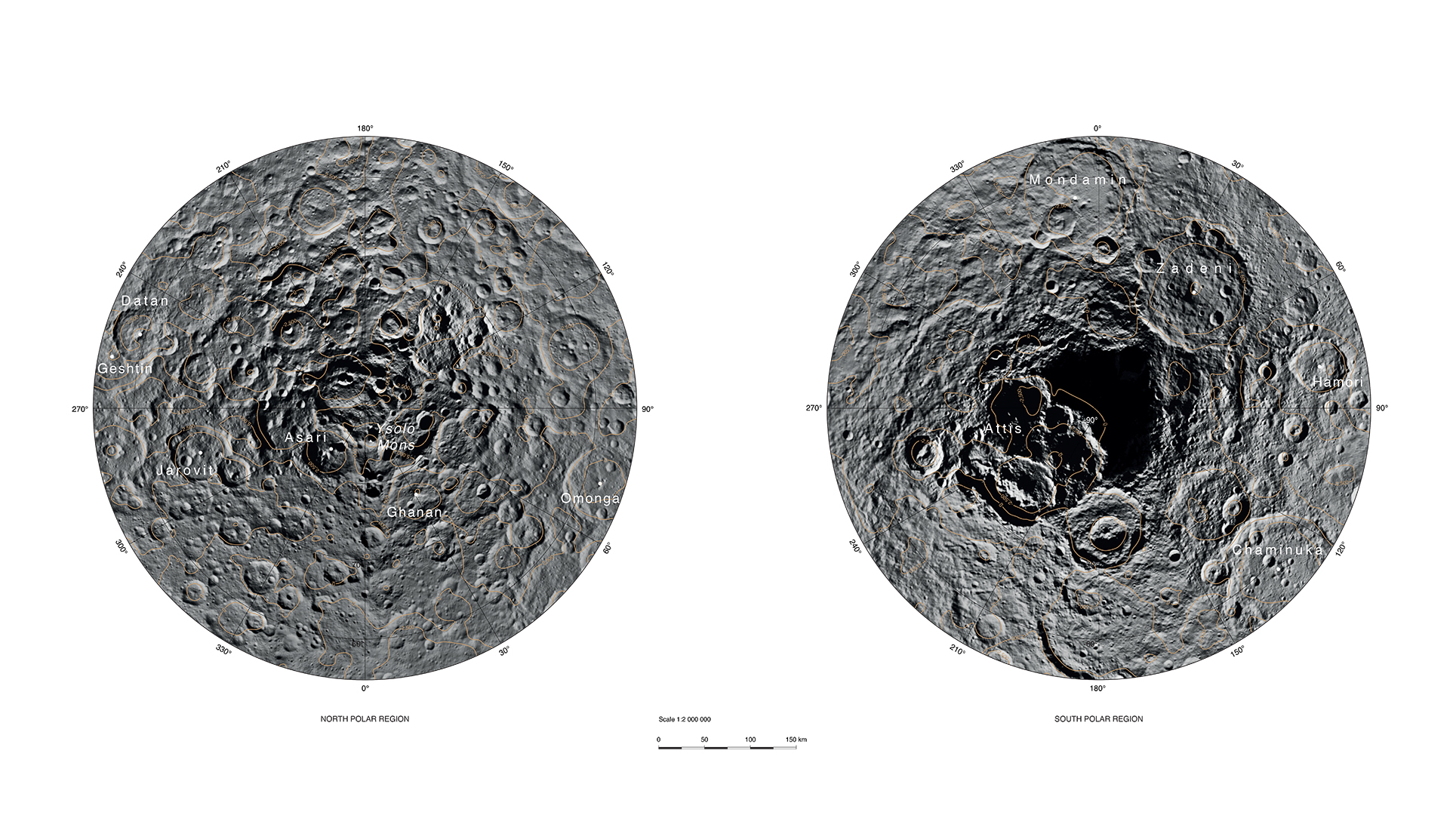
Asari-Zadeni section
(PDF version)

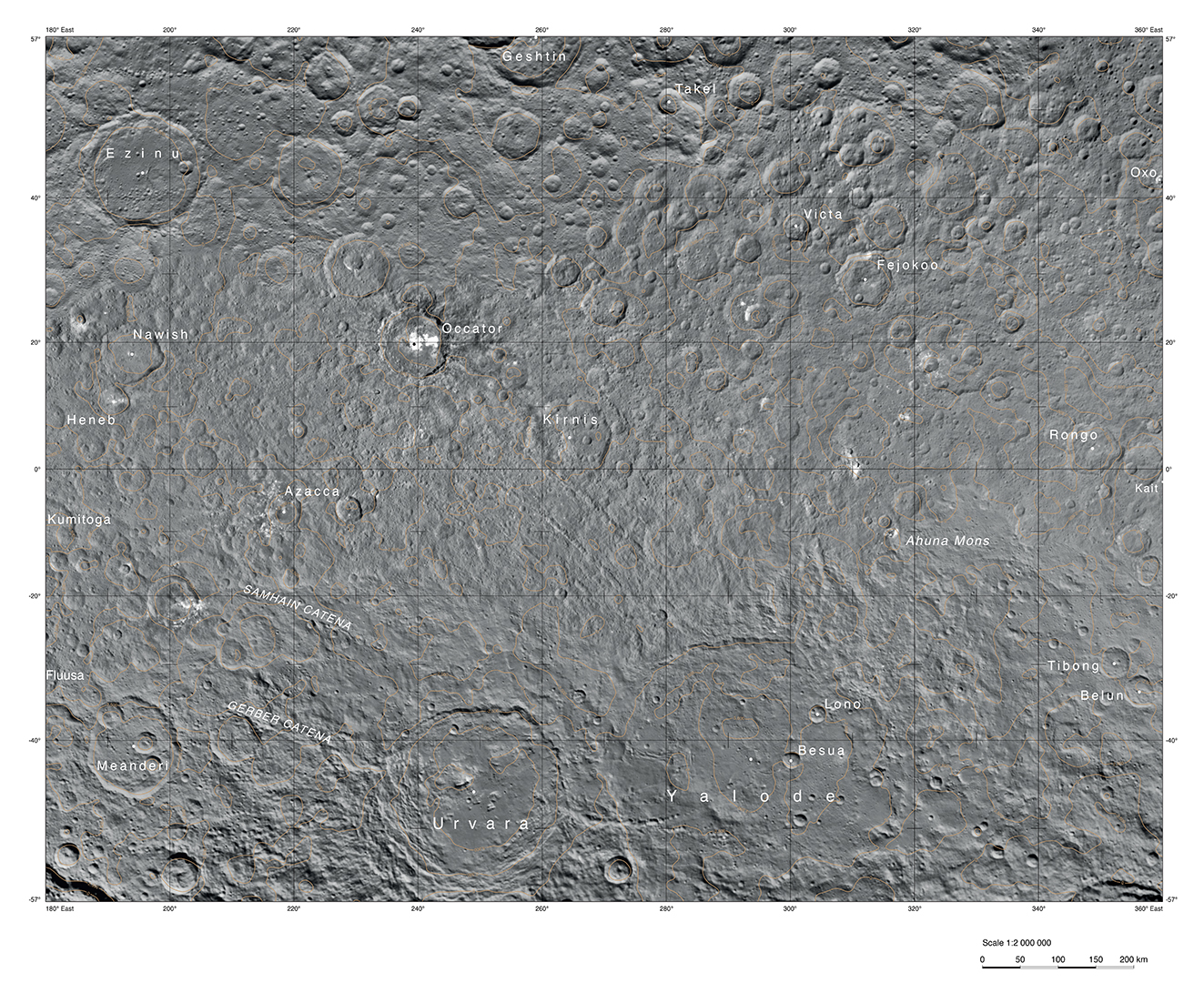
Occator section
(PDF version)

=== Maps of Ceres ===
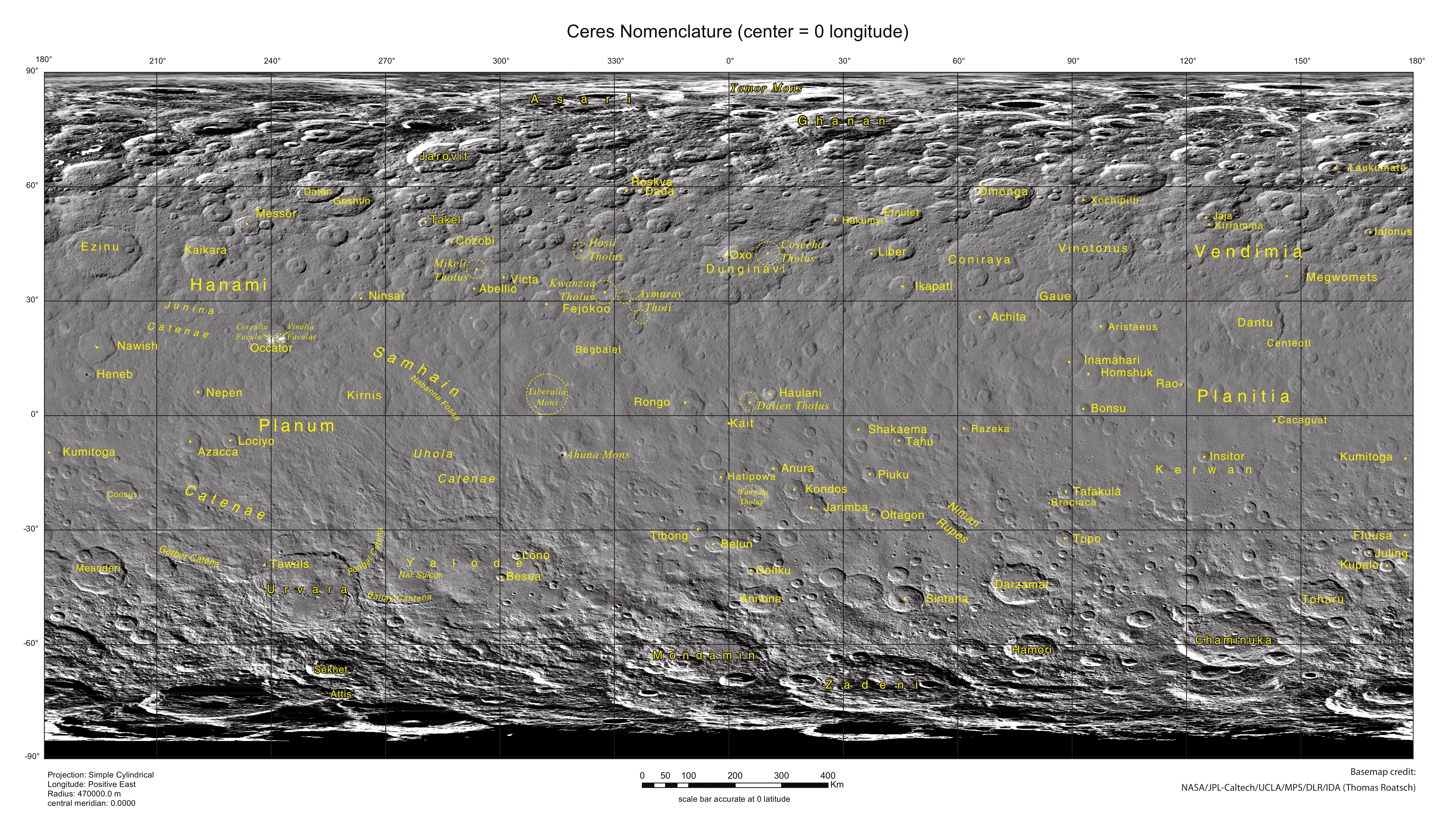
Map of Ceres feature names

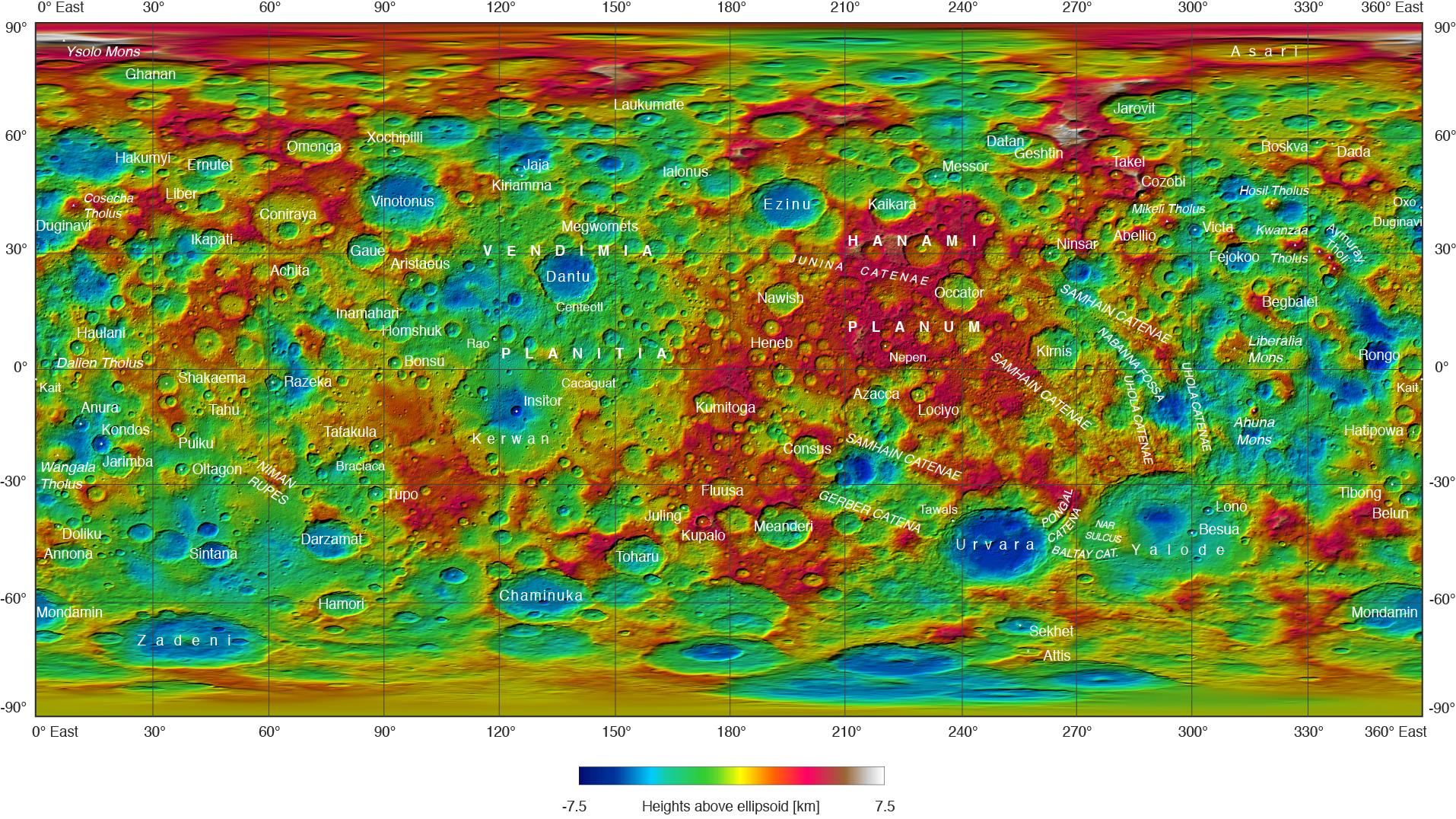
Topographical map of Ceres

=== Flyover videos ===
Surface features exaggerated

Focus on Occator Crater

Flight over dwarf planet Ceres

Flyover of Occator Crater

== See also ==
Features on Ceres

- Ahuna Mons, a mountain on Ceres
- Bright spots on Ceres
- List of geological features on Ceres

Other asteroid missions

- List of minor planets and comets visited by spacecraft
- Chang'e 2 – 4179 Toutatis flyby
- Galileo probe – 951 Gaspra and 243 Ida flybys
- Hayabusa – 25143 Itokawa rendezvous and sample return
- Hayabusa2 – 162173 Ryugu rendezvous and sample return
- NEAR Shoemaker – 253 Mathilde flyby, orbited 433 Eros from 2000 to 2001
- OSIRIS-REx – 101955 Bennu sample return mission
- Rosetta – 2867 Šteins and 21 Lutetia flyby
