= Tupo Tuupo =

American Samoan gridiron football player (born 1978)

No. 35
- Position: Fullback/Linebacker

Personal information
- Born: December 17, 1978 (age 47); American Samoa
- Listed height: 6 ft 3 in (1.91 m)
- Listed weight: 276 lb (125 kg)

Career information
- High school: Menlo-Atherton (Atherton, California, U.S.)
- College: Washington State (1997–2001)
- NFL draft: 2002: undrafted

Career history
- San Diego Chargers (2002)*; Los Angeles Avengers (2003)*; BC Lions (2003)*; San Jose SaberCats (2004); Las Vegas Gladiators (2005)*; Everett Hawks (2005); Stockton Lightning (2006–2008)
- * Offseason or practice squad member only

Awards and highlights
- ArenaBowl champion (2004)
- Stats at ArenaFan.com

Tupo Tuupo (born December 17, 1978) is an American Samoan former player of American football. He played college football at Washington State as a linebacker, and signed with the San Diego Chargers as an undrafted free agent in 2002. He played professionally for the San Jose SaberCats of the Arena Football League (AFL) as a fullback/linebacker.

== Early life ==
Tupo Tuupo was born on December 17, 1978, in American Samoa. He played high school football at Menlo-Atherton High School in Atherton, California. He played both offensive line and linebacker as a senior in 1996.

== College career ==
Tuupo played college football for the Washington State Cougars of Washington State University. He was redshirted in 1997, and was a four-year letterman from 1998 to 2001. In 1998, the Omaha World-Herald stated that their favorite name in the Pacific-10 Conference was "Tupo Tuupo". Going into his redshirt freshman year, Tuupo was projected as a starter at middle linebacker but ended up missing the first two months of the season due to a shoulder injury. In August 1999, he was briefly moved to tight end but then switched back to linebacker after two practices. He played defensive end from 2000 to 2001. In 2000, Tuupo lost his 1997 Rose Bowl ring after removing it to wash his hands in a Portland, Oregon, airport bathroom. In April 2001, Washington State fans found his ring at a Spokane, Washington, pawn shop. As a senior in 2001, Tuupo posted a career-high 22 tackles (including 10 solo). He earned second-team Academic All-Pac-10 honors for the 2001 season.

== Professional career ==
After going undrafted in the 2002 NFL draft, Tuupo signed with the San Diego Chargers on April 26, 2002. He was later released on August 26, 2002.

On December 3, 2002, Tuupo signed with the Los Angeles Avengers of the Arena Football League (AFL) for the 2003 season. He was waived on January 26, 2003, before the start of the season.

Tuupo then signed with the BC Lions of the Canadian Football League (CFL) as a defensive tackle. On June 7, 2003, it was reported that he had been released.

Tuupo was signed by the AFL's San Jose SaberCats on January 16, 2004. He was a fullback/linebacker during his time in the AFL as the league played under ironman rules. He was placed on injured reserve on February 20, 2004, and activated from injured reserve on May 21, 2004. Tuupo played in two games overall for San Jose during the 2004 season, posting one solo tackle and three assisted tackles. On June 27, 2004, the SaberCats won ArenaBowl XVIII against the Arizona Rattlers by a score of 69–62.

Tuupo joined the Las Vegas Gladiators of the AFL for the 2005 season, but was later released on January 24, 2005. He then played for the Everett Hawks of the National Indoor Football League in 2005. Tuupo was noted for "pound[ing] the turf in anguish" after Everett's 54–52 playoff loss to the Tri-Cities Fever on July 15, 2005.

Tuupo signed with the af2's Stockton Lightning for the 2006 season. He recorded season totals of nine carries for 22 yards and two touchdowns, six receptions for 39 yards, 25.5 tackles, and one sack. He also led the team with four quarterback hurries. In April 2007, he was assigned to the Lightning for the 2007 season. In March 2008, Tuupo was assigned to the Lightning for his third af2 season.
