= Elisapeta Tuupo-Alaimaleata =

American-Samoan educator

Elisapeta Tuupo‐Alaimaleata
- Born: Samoa
- Other names: Peta, Elisapeta Alaimaleata
- Education: University of Hawaii at Manoa
- Occupation: Educator

Elisapeta 'Peta' Tuupo‐Alaimaleata is an American-Samoan educator.

Tuupo‐Alaimaleata was born and raised in Samoa. She has a master's degree in education from the University of Hawaii, Manoa.

Tuupo‐Alaimaleata began her career in education as a classroom teacher in American Samoa. She then worked for the University of Hawaii's Manoa teacher training program as a teacher coordinator. She has also worked on a number of literacy development and community empowerment projects at the university.

Tuupo‐Alaimaleata has a history of working with the wider Samoan community to promote Samoan heritage, language, and culture.

While teaching Samoan at the First Samoan Methodist Church in Salt Lake she saw the need for a more established language school and so founded the Le Fetuao Samoan Language Center in Honolulu. The school is the first of its kind in Hawaii and provides free Samoan language education, specifically targeting children and young people. As founder, Tuupo‐Alaimaleata was instrumental in establishing the school and securing support for it from the Administration for Native Americans and Hawai'i People's Fund. She is currently executive director of the school.

Internationally, she is a voice for issues around the Samoan language and language preservation, including at the World Indigenous Peoples Conference on Education and Sosaiete Aota Amata Samoa I Aotearoaconference.
