= List of craters on minor planets =

- Ceres: 90 craters (24.9%)
- Eros: 37 craters (10.2%)
- Gaspra: 31 craters (8.6%)
- Ida: 21 craters (5.8%)
- Itokawa: 10 craters (2.8%)
- Lutetia: 19 craters (5.3%)
- Mathilde: 23 craters (6.4%)
- Pluto: 17 craters (4.7%)
- Šteins: 23 craters (6.4%)
- Vesta: 90 craters (24.9%)
Distribution of named craters on minor planets as of 2017.

This is a list of all named craters on minor planets in the Solar System as named by IAU's Working Group for Planetary System Nomenclature. In addition tentatively named craters—such as those of Pluto—may also be referred to. The number of craters is given in parentheses. For a full list of all craters, see list of craters in the Solar System.

== Images ==
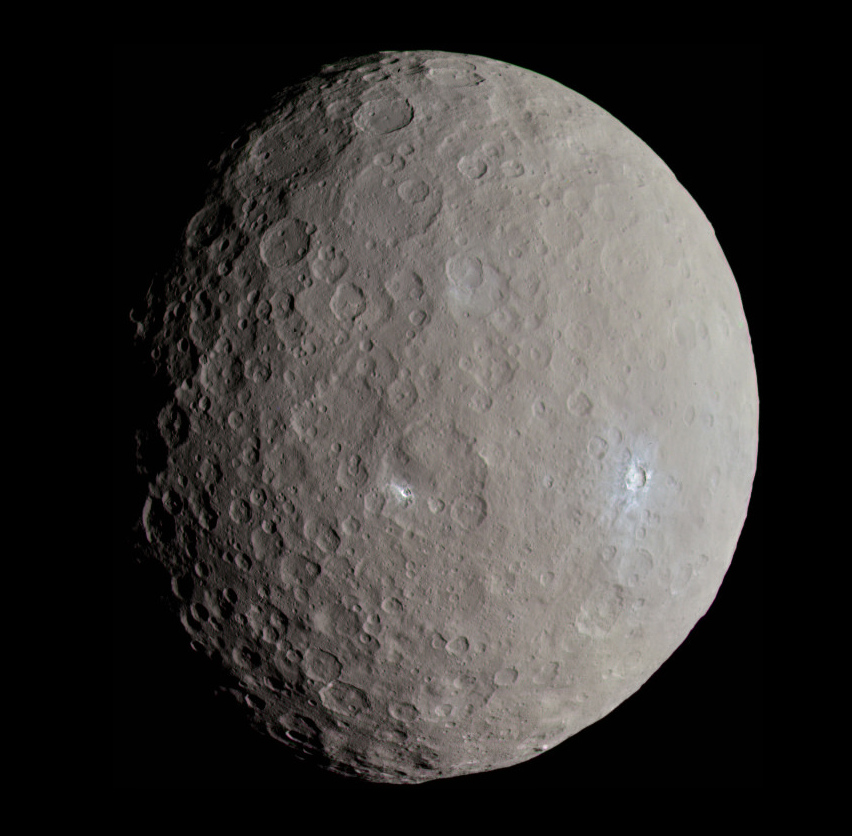
Ceres

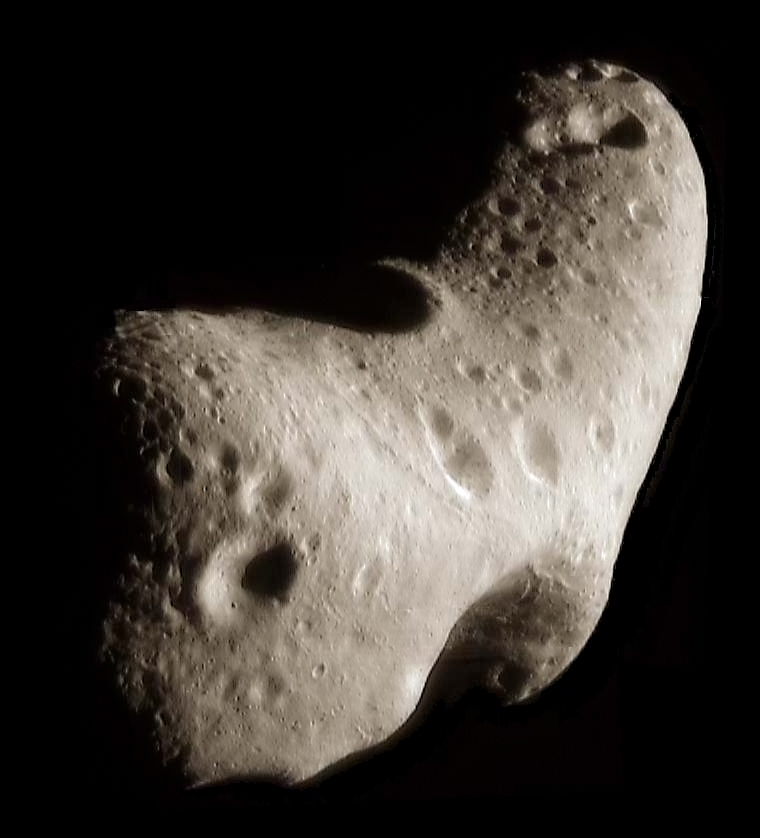
433 Eros

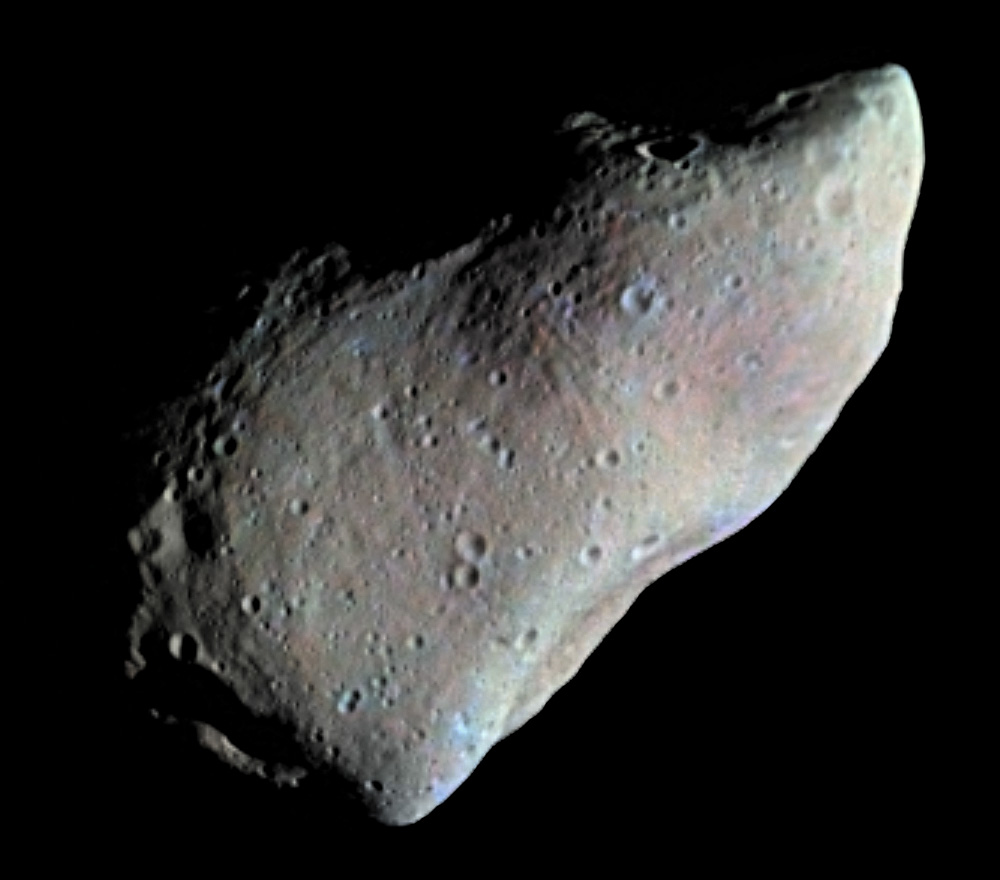
951 Gaspra

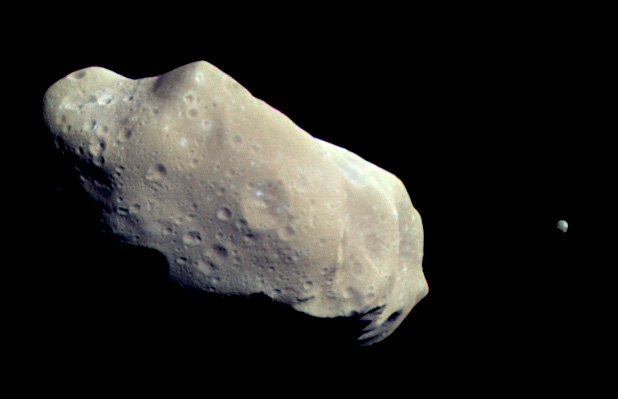
243 Ida

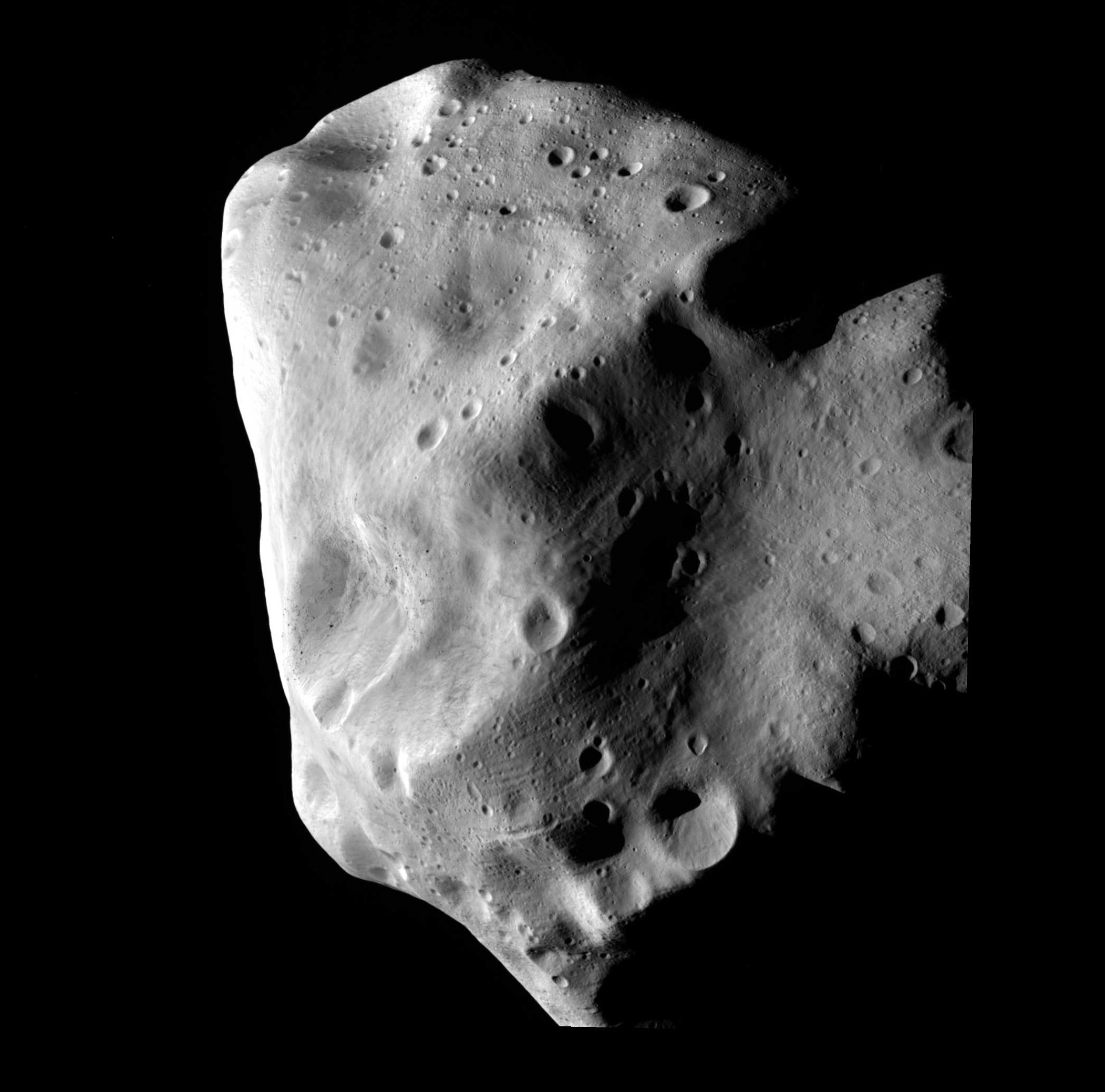
21 Lutetia

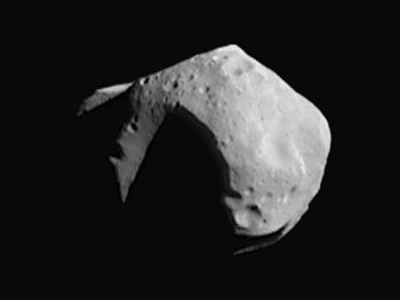
253 Mathilde

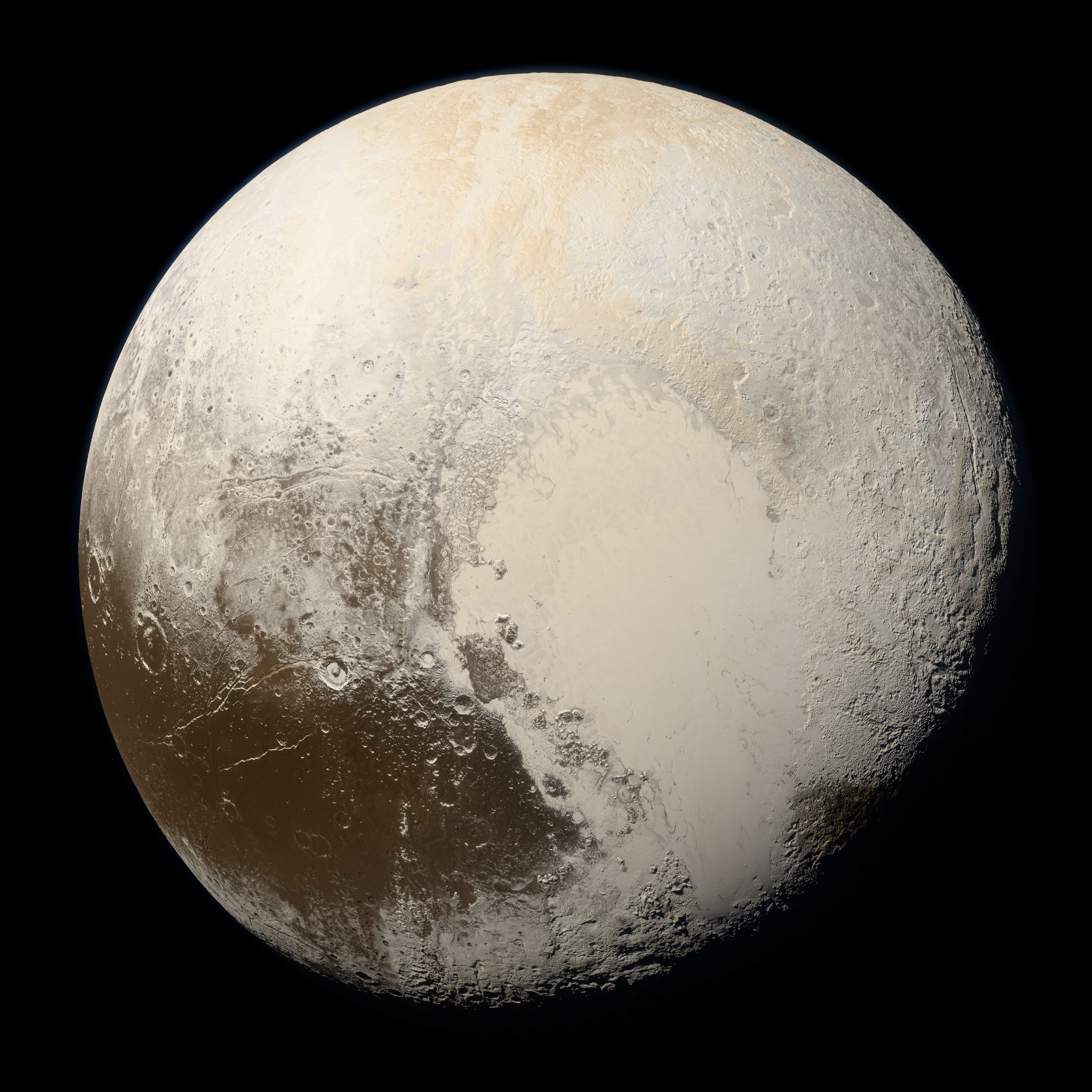
Pluto

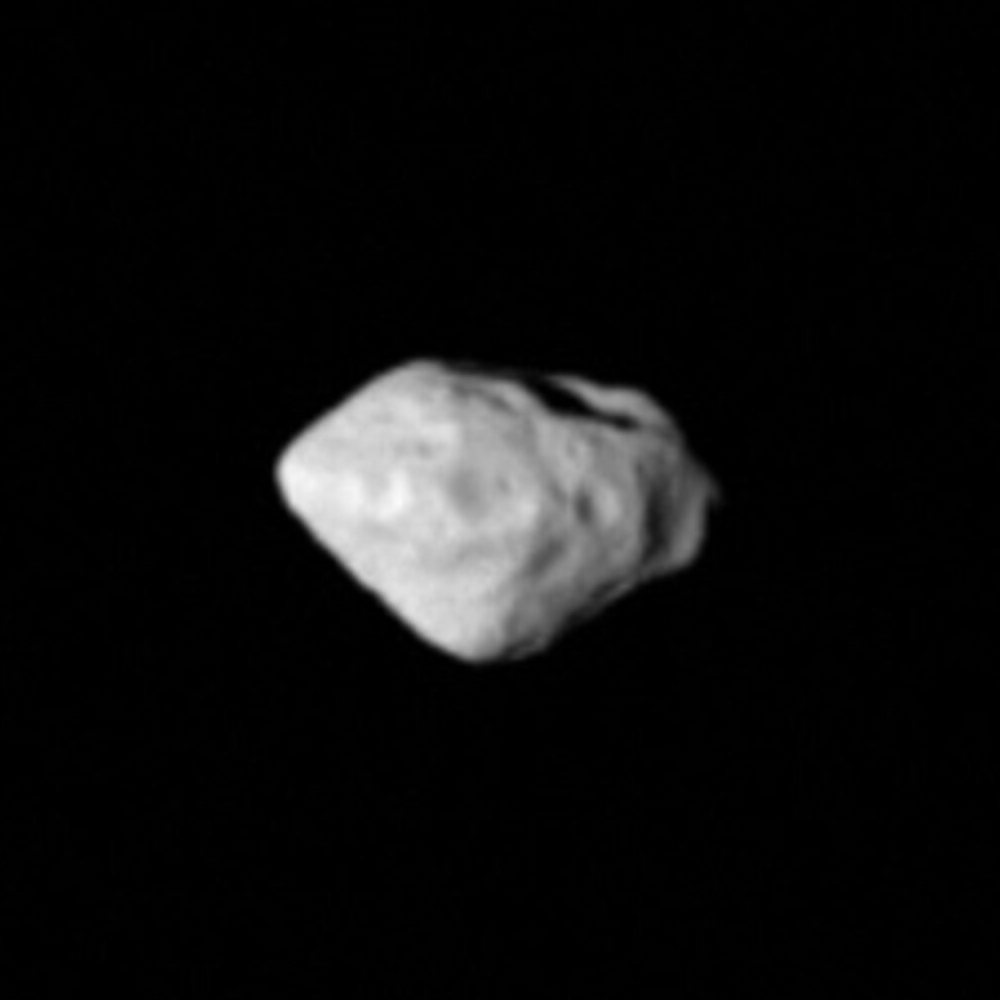
2867 Šteins

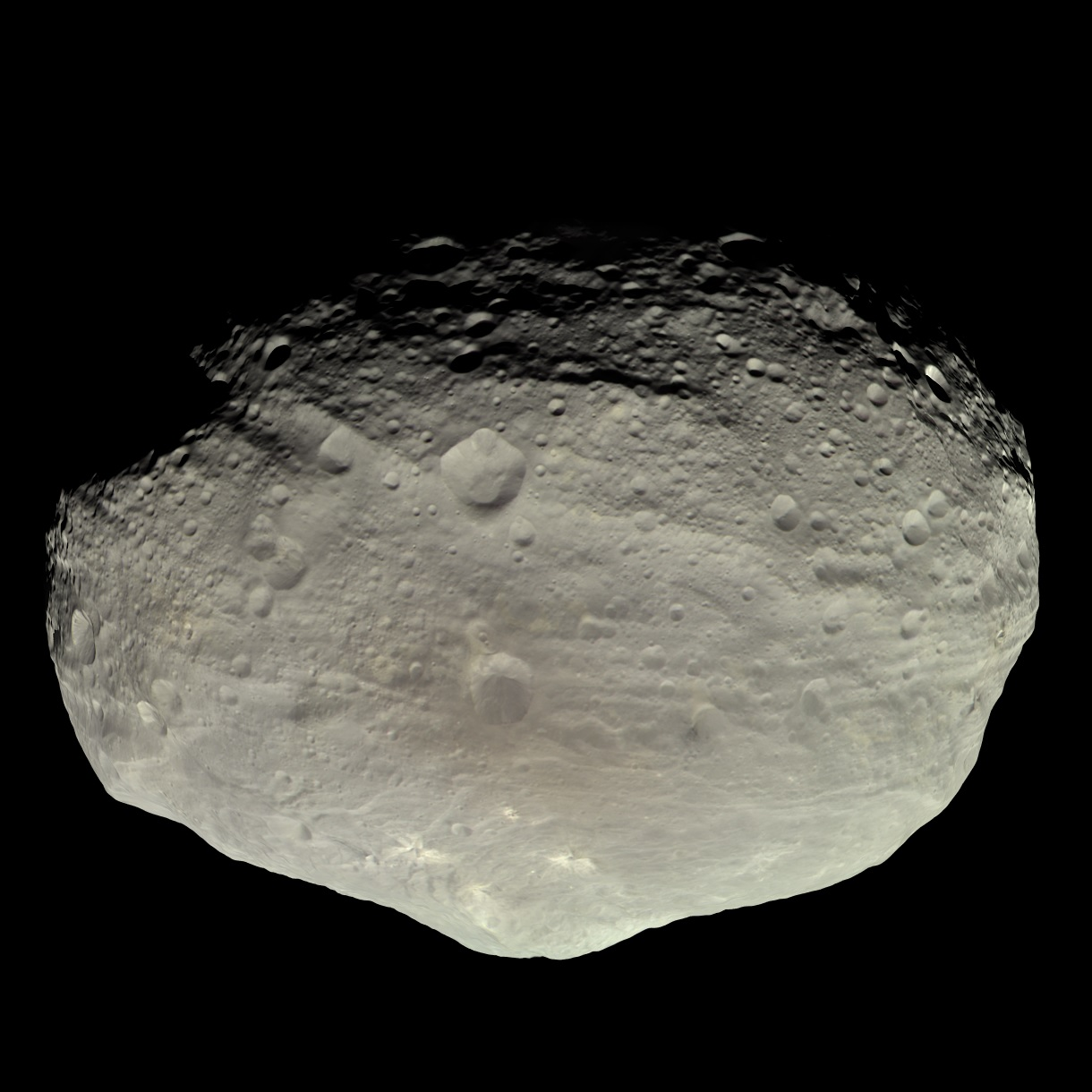
4 Vesta

== Arrokoth (1) ==
Crater	Coordinates	Diameter (km)	Approval Year	Eponym	Ref
Sky	–	6.8	2021	The English word "sky"	WGPSN

back to top

== Ceres (90) ==
Crater	Coordinates	Diameter (km)	Approval Year	Eponym	Ref
Abellio	33.2°N 66.91°W	32	2015	Gaul god of the apple tree	WGPSN
Achita	25.82°N 65.96°E	40	2015	Nigerian god of agriculture	WGPSN
Annona	48.14°S 8.43°E	60	2015	Roman goddess of crops and of the harvest	WGPSN
Anura	13.92°S 11.79°E	37	2015	Arawakan (Guyana) spirit of the tobacco seeds	WGPSN
Aristaeus	23.43°N 97.68°E	35.8	2016	Greek god of agriculture	WGPSN
Asari	83.03°N 40.12°W	56	2015	Syrian god of agriculture	WGPSN
Attis	73.07°S 102.16°W	22	2015	Greek/Phrygian god of vegetation and of fertility	WGPSN
Azacca	6.66°S 141.6°W	49.91	2015	Haitian god of agriculture	WGPSN
Begbalel	17.71°N 34.65°W	102	2016	Yap Islands (Caroline Islands Micronesia) guardian of the taro fields who controls the yield of the crops	WGPSN
Belun	33.71°S 3.75°W	36.04	2015	Belarus god of the fields	WGPSN
Besua	42.35°S 59.79°W	17	2015	Egyptian grain god	WGPSN
Bilwis	86.2°N 79.6°E	7	2017	German corn spirit	WGPSN
Binayo	86.4°N 145.2°E	16	2017	Philippine (Hanunoo/Mangyan Mindoro Island) female spirit caretaker of the rice spirits	WGPSN
Bonsu	1.74°N 93.21°E	31	2015	Bateg/Batek (Malaysia) god who watches over the fruits and flowers	WGPSN
Braciaca	22.77°S 84.37°E	8	2016	Celtic god of malt	WGPSN
Cacaguat	1.19°S 143.61°E	13.6	2016	Nicaraguan god of cacao	WGPSN
Cachimana	85.2°N 146.8°W	18	2017	Atabapo and Inirida tribes’ (Upper Orinoco River region Venezuela) vegetation god who ripens the crops and controls the seasons	WGPSN
Centeotl	18.95°N 141.22°E	6	2016	Mexican god/goddess of maize and agriculture	WGPSN
Chaminuka	58.58°S 131.2°E	122	2015	Shona (Zimbabwe) spirit who provides rains in times of droughts	WGPSN
Coniraya	39.9°N 65.73°E	135	2015	Inca god who was responsible for the system of agricultural terracing and irrigation	WGPSN
Consus	20.7°S 159.5°W	64	2016	Italian agricultural god who watched over the harvested and stored crop	WGPSN
Cozobi	45.33°N 72.69°W	24	2015	Zapotec (S. Mexico) god of maize and of abundant food	WGPSN
Dada	58.63°N 23.24°W	12	2015	Nigerian god of vegetables	WGPSN
Dantu	24.3°N 138.23°E	126	2015	Ghanaian god associated with the planting of the corn	WGPSN
Darzamat	44.21°S 76.4°E	92	2015	Darzamate Dārza-māte; Latvian spirit “Mother of the garden.”	WGPSN
Datan	59.5°N 107.69°W	60	2015	Polish god of the tilling of the soil	WGPSN
Dikhan	81.8°N 78.1°E	21	2017	Dikhan baba; Kazakh preislamic deity of farming	WGPSN
Doliku	40.79°S 5.88°E	15	2015	Dahomey (Benin) god of the fields	WGPSN
Duginavi	39.2°N 4.29°E	155	2016	Kogi (N. Colombia) god who taught people agriculture	WGPSN
Ernutet	52.93°N 45.52°E	53.4	2015	Egyptian cobra-headed goddess of the harvest	WGPSN
Enzinu	43.24°N 164.3°W	116	2015	Sumerian goddess of the grain	WGPSN
Fejokoo	29.15°N 47.89°W	68	2015	Nigerian god who supplied the yams	WGPSN
Fluusa	31.31°S 178.22°E	60	2015	Oscan (ancient S. Italy) goddess of flowers counterpart of Roman goddess Flora	WGPSN
Gaue	30.81°N 86.16°E	80	2015	Germanic goddess to whom offerings are made in harvesting the rye	WGPSN
Geshtin	57°N 101.19°W	80	2015	Sumerian/Babylonian goddess of the vine	WGPSN
Ghanan	76.56°N 30.76°E	68	2015	Mayan god of maize	WGPSN
Hakumyi	51.42°N 27.75°E	29.2	2016	Paraguay Brazil and Bolivia spirit helpful in gardening	WGPSN
Hamori	60.86°S 79.44°E	60	2015	Japanese god protector of tree leaves	WGPSN
Hatipowa	16.08°S 2.29°W	40	2016	Indian god of agriculture	WGPSN
Haulani	5.8°N 10.77°E	34	2015	Hau-lani; Hawaiian plant goddess	WGPSN
Heneb	10.87°N 168.96°W	39	2015	Egyptian god of grain produce and vineyards	WGPSN
Homshuk	11.23°N 94.06°E	70	2015	Popoluca (S. Mexico) spirit of corn (maize)	WGPSN
Ialonus	48.15°N 168.53°E	16.5	2016	British god of the cultivated field and of the meadows	WGPSN
Ikapati	33.84°N 45.61°E	50	2015	Philippine goddess of the cultivated lands	WGPSN
Inamahari	14.13°N 89.22°E	68	2015	Catawba (S. Carolina USA) pair of male and female deities invoked for success at the sowing season	WGPSN
Insitor	10.71°S 124.87°E	26	2015	Roman agricultural deity in charge of the sowing	WGPSN
Jaja	52.09°N 125.27°E	22	2015	Abkhazian (Transcaucasia) harvest goddess	WGPSN
Jarimba	24.08°S 21.25°E	69	2015	Arunta/Aranda (Australia) god of flowers and fruit	WGPSN
Jarovit	67.9°N 75.26°W	66	2015	Slavic god of fertility and harvest who comes down to the Underworld after every harvest and returns to a usual world every spring	WGPSN
Juling	35.9°S 168.48°E	20	2015	Sakai/Orang Asli (Malaysia) spirit of the crops	WGPSN
Kaikara	42.82°N 137.57°W	72	2015	Konjo and Banyoro/Nyoro (Uganda) goddess of harvest	WGPSN
Kait	2.1°S 137.57°W	0.4	2015	Hattic goddess of grain (Asia Minor)	WGPSN
Kerwan	10.77°S 123.99°E	280	2015	Hopi spirit of the sprouting maize (Arizona SW USA)	WGPSN
Kiriamma	50.32°N 126.33°E	18.7	2016	Veddan (Sri Lanka) goddess provider of food (“Milk mother”)	WGPSN
Kirnis	4.9°N 95.7°W	115	2015	Lithuanian spirit guardian of cherry trees	WGPSN
Kondos	19.34°S 17.31°E	44	2015	Finnish agricultural deity	WGPSN
Kumitoga	10.09°S 178.83°E	96	2015	Polynesian goddess of plant life	WGPSN
Kupalo	39.44°S 173.2°E	26	2015	Russian god of vegetation and of the harvest	WGPSN
Laukumate	65.03°N 159.42°E	29.7	2016	Latvian spirit “Mother of the fields.”	WGPSN
Liber	42.56°N 37.8°E	23	2015	Roman god of agriculture	WGPSN
Lociyo	6.53°S 131.17°W	37.8	2016	Zapotec (Mexico) deity to whom a ceremony is performed when the first chili plant is cut	WGPSN
Lono	36.61°S 55.63°W	20	2015	Hawaiian god of agriculture	WGPSN
Meanderi	40.8°S 165.81°W	103	2015	Ngaing (New Guinea) goddess of taro sugar cane and other foods	WGPSN
Megwomets	36.54°N 146.22°E	78.7	2016	Yurok (California USA) dwarf god of acorns and the distributor of vegetal abundance	WGPSN
Messor	49.93°N 126.27°W	40	2015	Roman god of harvesting of cutting of the grain	WGPSN
Mlezi	76°N 136.8°W	41.5	2017	Name of god Tilo as “Food-Giver” (Tonga tribes of Malawi and Zambia)	WGPSN
Mondamin	62.24°S 6°W	126	2015	Ojibwe /Chippewa corn (maize) god (Lake Superior area Canada and USA)	WGPSN
Nawish	18.28°N 166.21°W	77	2015	Acoma (New Mexico SW USA) guardian of the field	WGPSN
Nepen	6.19°N 139.46°W	26.4	2016	Egyptian god of rain	WGPSN
Ninsar	30.3°N 96.74°W	40	2015	Sumerian goddess of plants and vegetation	WGPSN
Occator	19.82°N 120.67°W	92	2015	Roman agricultural deity of the harrowing	WGPSN
Oltagon	25.95°S 37.96°E	28	2015	Philippine agricultural goddess	WGPSN
Omonga	58.03°N 71.67°E	77	2015	Tomori/Mori (Celebes/Sulawesi Indonesia) rice spirit who dwells in the Moon	WGPSN
Oxo	42.21°N 0.4°W	10	2015	God of agriculture in Afro-Brazilian beliefs of Yoruba derivation	WGPSN
Piuku	15.37°S 36.99°E	31	2015	Barama River Caribs (Guyana) god of the manioc	WGPSN
Rao	8.1°N 119.01°E	12	2015	Polynesian god of turmeric	WGPSN
Razeka	3.21°S 61.63°E	38.38	2016	Arabian tribal god worshipped as the provider of food	WGPSN
Rongo	3.21°N 11.29°W	68	2015	Maori (New Zealand) god of agriculture of cultivated foods	WGPSN
Roskva	58.9°N 26.98°W	22	2015	Teutonic goddess who symbolizes the ripe fields of harvest	WGPSN
Sekhet	66.42°S 104.95°W	40	2015	Egyptian name of Isis as goddess of cultivated lands and fields	WGPSN
Shakaema	3.66°S 33.93°E	47	2015	Jivaro (Ecuador and Peru) god of vegetation invoked in the planting and cultivation of bananas	WGPSN
Sintana	48.07°S 46.2°E	58	2015	Columbian deity who produced the fertile black earth for sowing	WGPSN
Tafakula	19.82°S 88.59°E	34	2015	Tongan (Polynesia) goddess invoked for favorable seasons for the crops	WGPSN
Tahu	6.59°S 44.79°E	25	2015	Maori (New Zealand) personification of all food	WGPSN
Takel	50.76°N 79.52°W	22	2015	Malaysian goddess in charge of the tuber harvest	WGPSN
Tawals	39.06°S 121.98°W	8.8	2016	Polish god of the fields of the tilling	WGPSN
Tibong	29.82°S 7.8°W	36	2015	Land Dayaks (Borneo/Kalimantan Indonesia) malevolent spirit who devours and depletes the rice	WGPSN
Toharu	48.32°S 155.95°E	86	2015	Pawnee (Nebraska Central USA) god of food and vegetation	WGPSN
Tupo	32.35°S 88.38°E	36	2015	Polynesian god of turmeric	WGPSN
Uvara	45.66°S 110.76°W	170	2015	Indian and Iranian deity of plants and fields	WGPSN
Victa	36.23°N 58.96°W	32	2015	Roman goddess of food and nourishment	WGPSN
Vinotonus	43.02°N 95.12°E	140	2015	Celtic Briton god of vines	WGPSN
Xochipilli	56.66°N 93.21°E	22.7	2016	Aztec fertility god associated with maize and flowers; patron of music and dance	WGPSN
Yalode	42.58°S 67.52°W	260	2015	Dahomey goddess worshipped by women at the harvest rites	WGPSN
Zadeni	70.36°S 38.34°E	129.28	2015	Ancient Georgian god of bountiful harvest	WGPSN

back to top

== Eros (37) ==
Crater	Coordinates	Diameter (km)	Approval Year	Eponym	Ref
Abelard	3.5°S 12.2°W	1.1	2003	Peter; French philosopher lover of Heloise (1079–1142)	WGPSN
Aida	7.9°N 130.5°W	1.6	2003	Ethiopian slave beloved of Egyptian officer Radames in Verdi's opera Aida (Italy 1870)	WGPSN
Avtandil	22.5°S 126.9°E	1.2	2003	Lover of Tinatin in Shota Rustavely's novel Knight in tiger-skin (Georgia 12th century)	WGPSN
Bovary	61°S 27.3°W	0.8	2003	Romantic heroine of Flaubert's novel Madame Bovary (France 19th century)	WGPSN
Casanova	46.6°N 124°E	0.9	2003	Giovanni; Italian adventurer lover and author (1725–1798)	WGPSN
Catherine	9.1°N 171.1°W	1.1	2003	Tragic lover of Heathcliff in Emily Brontë's novel Wuthering Heights (England 1847)	WGPSN
Cupid	8.1°N 129.8°E	1.8	2003	Roman god of love equivalent of Eros	WGPSN
Don Juan	29.5°N 3.3°E	1.1	2003	Lover character of medieval European legend retold in Molière's Don Juan (France 1665)	WGPSN
Don Quixote	57.7°S 109.2°E	0.9	2003	Knight-errant imagined Dulcinea as his lady-love in Cervantes' Don Quixote (Spain 1605)	WGPSN
Dulcinea	76.1°S 87.1°E	1.4	2003	Imaginary lady-love of the knight Don Quixote in Cervantes' Don Quixote (Spain 1605)	WGPSN
Eurydice	13.5°N 170°W	2.2	2003	In Greek mythology wife of singer Orpheus who fails to bring her from Hades	WGPSN
Fujitsubo	3.7°S 62.7°W	1.7	2003	Lover of Genji in The Tale of Genji by Murasaki Sikibu first modern novel (Japan c.1000)	WGPSN
Galatea	10.2°S 176.9°E	1.4	2003	Woman in Greek mythology brought to life from statue by Pygmalion legendary king of Cyprus	WGPSN
Gamba	20.6°S 54.1°W	1.3	2003	Marina; companion of astronomer Galileo Galilei (Italy 17th century)	WGPSN
Genji	19.5°S 88.6°W	1.5	2003	Prince lover of Fujitsubo in The Tale of Genji by Murasaki Sikibu (Japan c.1000)	WGPSN
Heathcliff	7.4°N 167.9°W	1.1	2003	Tragic lover of Catherine in Emily Brontë's novel Wuthering Heights (England 1847)	WGPSN
Himeros	21.2°N 77.7°E	10	2003	Attendant of Eros; personification of the longing of love in Greek mythology	WGPSN
Hios	9.4°S 130.9°W	1.3	2003	Love child of Poseidon and Hiona in Greek mythology; also island (Chios) in the Aegean Sea	WGPSN
Jahan	74.2°N 66.5°E	2.1	2003	Shah; Mogul emperor built Taj Mahal in Agra India for wife Mumtaz Mahal (1592–1666)	WGPSN
Kastytis	6.8°N 161.3°W	1.7	2003	Lithuanian blacksmith lover of sea goddess Jurate; taken by her to the sea floor	WGPSN
Leander	25.6°N 149.7°E	1.4	2003	Lover of Hero swam to her across Hellespont every night and drowned; in despair Hero drowned herself	WGPSN
Leylie	3°S 23.5°W	1.9	2003	Majnoon's lover in Leylie and Majnoon poems by Jami and Navoi (Khorasan 1480s)	WGPSN
Lolita	35.2°S 162.3°E	1.8	2003	Young girl from V. Nabokov's novel Lolita (USA 1955)	WGPSN
Mahal	79.4°N 170°W	1.2	2003	Mumtaz; Mogul empress; favorite wife of Shah Jahan who built Taj Mahal (1592–1631)	WGPSN
Majnoon	3.8°N 28.8°W	2.1	2003	Leylie's lover in Leylie and Majnoon poems by Jami and Navoi (Khorasan 1480s)	WGPSN
Mélisande	67.1°N 174.4°E	1	2003	Wife of Prince Golaud and lover of his half-brother Pelléas in Maeterlinck drama (Belgium 1892)	WGPSN
Narcissus	18.2°N 7.1°W	2.9	2003	Young man from Greek mythology who fell in love with his own reflection in water	WGPSN
Orpheus	25.6°N 176.7°W	1.1	2003	Singer and musician in Greek mythology; fails to bring his love Eurydice from Hades	WGPSN
Pao-yü	73.2°S 105.6°W	0.8	2003	Lover of Tai-yü in novel by Ts'ao Chan (China 18th century; also Dream of the Red Chamber 1929)	WGPSN
Pelléas	63.1°N 138.7°E	1.2	2003	Beloved of Mélisande in Maeterlinck drama and later musical works by Faure Debussy and Schoenberg	WGPSN
Psyche	31.6°N 94.6°W	4.8	2003	Beloved of Eros; personification of human soul in Greek mythology	WGPSN
Pygmalion	1.8°S 168.9°E	1.7	2003	King of Cyprus; carved statue of woman brought to life as Galatea whom he married	WGPSN
Radames	5.2°S 115.1°W	1.6	2003	Egyptian officer beloved of Ethiopian slave Aida in Verdi's opera Aida (Italy 1870)	WGPSN
Selene	14.2°S 12.5°W	3.6	2003	Moon goddess in Greek mythology lover of Endymion	WGPSN
Tai-yü	47°S 126.1°W	1.4	2003	Beloved by Pao-yü in novel by Ts'ao Chan (China 18th century; also Dream of the Red Chamber 1929)	WGPSN
Tutanekai	56.4°N 3.3°W	2.1	2003	Māori hero beloved of young maiden Hinemoa who swam across Lake Rotorua to marry him	WGPSN
Valentine	14.6°N 151.6°E	2.2	2003	St. Valentine's Day (principally Roman) for all lovers	WGPSN

back to top

== Gaspra (31) ==
Crater	Coordinates	Diameter (km)	Approval Year	Eponym	Ref
Aix	47.9°N 160.3°W	0.6	1994	Spa in France	WGPSN
Alupka	65°N 65°W	0.3	1994	Spa in Crimea Ukraine	WGPSN
Baden-Baden	46°N 55°W	0.3	1994	Spa in Germany	WGPSN
Badgastein	25°N 3°W	0.4	1994	Spa in Austria	WGPSN
Bagnoles	55°N 122°W	0.4	1994	Spa in France	WGPSN
Bath	13.4°N 9.7°W	0.9	1994	Spa in England	WGPSN
Beppu	3.9°N 58.4°W	0.6	1994	Spa on Kyushu Japan	WGPSN
Brookton	27.7°N 103.3°W	0.3	1994	Spa in New York USA	WGPSN
Calistoga	30°N 2°W	1.2	1994	Resort in California USA	WGPSN
Carlsbad	29.7°N 88.8°W	0.5	1994	Spa in Czech Republic	WGPSN
Charax	8.6°N -0°E	0.9	1994	Roman fortress in Gaspra Crimea Ukraine	WGPSN
Helwan	22.4°N 118.9°W	0.4	1994	Spa in Egypt	WGPSN
Ixtapan	11.9°N 86.9°W	0.7	1994	Spa in Mexico	WGPSN
Katsiveli	55°N 65°W	0.3	1994	Spa in Crimea Ukraine	WGPSN
Krynica	49°N 35°W	0.4	1994	Health resort in Poland	WGPSN
Lisdoonvarna	16.5°N 1.9°E	0.4	1994	Spa in Ireland	WGPSN
Loutraki	42°N 140°W	0.4	1994	Spa in Greece	WGPSN
Mandal	23.5°N 46.5°W	0.1	1994	Spa in Norway	WGPSN
Manikaran	62°N 155°W	0.5	1994	Spa in India	WGPSN
Marienbad	35.4°N 81.8°W	0.6	1994	Spa in Czech Republic	WGPSN
Miskhor	15°N 65.9°W	0.5	1994	Spa in Crimea Ukraine	WGPSN
Moree	15.1°N 164.4°W	0.7	1994	Spa in Australia	WGPSN
Ramlösa	15°N 4.9°W	0.7	1994	Spa in Sweden	WGPSN
Rio Hondo	31.7°N 20.7°W	0.6	1994	Spa in Argentina	WGPSN
Rotorua	18.8°N 30.7°W	0.5	1994	Spa in New Zealand	WGPSN
Saratoga	50°N 90°E	2.8	1994	Spa in New York USA	WGPSN
Spa	51.5°N 152°W	1.6	1994	Health resort in Belgium	WGPSN
Tang-Shan	59°N 104°E	2.1	1994	Spa in China	WGPSN
Yalova	29°N 10°W	0.4	1994	Health resort in Turkey	WGPSN
Yalta	57.6°N 98.7°E	1.4	1994	Spa in Crimea Ukraine	WGPSN
Zohar	23°N 118°W	0.4	1994	Spa in Israel	WGPSN

back to top

== Ida (21) ==
Crater	Coordinates	Diameter (km)	Approval Year	Eponym	Ref
Afon	6.5°S 0°E	0.8	1994	Cave in Russia	WGPSN
Atea	5.7°S 18.9°E	2	1997	Cave in the Muller Range of Papua New Guinea	WGPSN
Azzurra	30.5°N 142.8°W	9.6	1997	Flooded cave (known as the Blue Grotto) on the island of Capri in southern Italy	WGPSN
Bilemot	27.8°S 29.2°E	1.8	1997	Lava tube in the Republic of Korea	WGPSN
Castellana	13.4°S 24.8°W	5.2	1997	Cave in Puglia region Italy	WGPSN
Choukoutien	12.8°N 23.6°E	1.1	1997	Site where Peking Man was discovered	WGPSN
Fingal	13.2°S 39.9°E	1.5	1997	Cave in the Hebrides	WGPSN
Kartchner	7°S 179°E	0.9	1997	Cave in Arizona	WGPSN
Kazumura	32°S 41.1°E	2.1	1997	Lava tube in Hawaii	WGPSN
Lascaux	0.8°N 161.2°E	11.8	1997	Cave in France noted for its prehistoric paintings	WGPSN
Lechuguilla	7.9°N 2.9°W	1.5	1997	Cave in Carlsbad National Park New Mexico	WGPSN
Mammoth	18.3°S 179.7°W	10.2	1997	Longest limestone cavern known on Earth	WGPSN
Manjang	28.3°S 90.5°E	1	1997	Lava tube in the Republic of Korea	WGPSN
Orgnac	6.3°S 157.3°W	10.6	1997	Cave in France	WGPSN
Padirac	4.3°S 5.2°E	1.9	1997	Cave with underground river in France	WGPSN
Peacock	2°S 52°E	0.2	1997	Cave in Florida USA	WGPSN
Postojna	42.9°S 0.1°W	6	1997	Large cave in Slovenia	WGPSN
Sterkfontein	4.1°S 54.1°E	4.7	1997	Cave in South Africa	WGPSN
Stiffe	27.9°S 126.5°E	1.5	1997	Karst cave in Sulmona Italy	WGPSN
Undara	2°N 113.8°E	8.5	1997	Lava tube from Undara Volcano North Queensland Australia	WGPSN
Viento	12.2°N 16.1°W	1.6	1997	Lava tube in Spain	WGPSN

back to top

== Itokawa (10) ==
Crater	Coordinates	Diameter (km)	Approval Year	Eponym	Ref
Catalina	17°S 14°E	0.02	2009	Catalina Observatory near Tucson AZ USA	WGPSN
Fuchinobe	34°N 91°W	0.04	2009	Place name in Sagamihara Japan	WGPSN
Gando	76°S 155°W	n.a.	2009	Spanish launch facility on Gran Canaria	WGPSN
Hammaguira	18°S 155°W	0.03	2009	French launch site in the Sahara Desert Algeria	WGPSN
Kamisunagawa	28°S 45°E	0.01	2009	Town in Hokkaido Japan where a microgravity test facility is located	WGPSN
Kamoi	6°N 116°W	0.01	2009	Town in Yokohama Japan where a factory of NEC TOSHIBA Space Systems Ltd. is located	WGPSN
Komaba	10°S 102°E	0.03	2009	Place name in Tokyo where the Institute of Space and Astronautical Science is located	WGPSN
Laurel	1°N 162°E	0.02	2009	City in Maryland USA where APL/JHU is located	WGPSN
Miyabaru	40°S 116°W	0.09	2009	Radar site in the Uchinoura Space Center in Japan	WGPSN
San Marco	28°S 41°W	n.a.	2009	An old oil platform near Kenya that served as a launch pad for Italian spacecraft	WGPSN

back to top

== Lutetia (19) ==
Crater	Coordinates	Diameter (km)	Approval Year	Eponym	Ref
Bagacum	46°N 49°E	3.7	2011	City at the time of Lutetia present-day Bavay in France	WGPSN
Basilia	73°N 176°W	3.5	2011	City at the time of Lutetia present-day Basel in Switzerland	WGPSN
Bonna	62°N 67°E	6	2011	City at the time of Lutetia present-day Bonn in Germany	WGPSN
Burdigala	52°N 149°W	10	2011	City at the time of Lutetia present-day Bordeaux in France	WGPSN
Florentia	23°N 137°E	10.9	2011	City at the time of Lutetia present-day Florence in Italy	WGPSN
Gaudiaco	58°N 5°E	6.7	2011	City at the time of Lutetia present-day Joué-lès-Tours in France	WGPSN
Genua	11°N 117°E	1.8	2011	City at the time of Lutetia present-day Genoa in Italy	WGPSN
Gerunda	78°N 68°E	4.7	2011	City at the time of Lutetia present-day Girona in Spain	WGPSN
Lauriacum	37°N 68°E	1.5	2011	City at the time of Lutetia present-day Enns in Austria; defines zero degrees longitude on Lutetia	WGPSN
Lugdunum	10°N 141°W	17	2011	City at the time of Lutetia present-day Lyon in France	WGPSN
Massilia	41°N 96°E	61	2011	City at the time of Lutetia present-day Marseille in France	WGPSN
Nicaea	43°N 179°W	21	2011	City at the time of Lutetia present-day Nice in France	WGPSN
Patavium	31°N 52°E	9.3	2011	City at the time of Lutetia present-day Padua in Italy	WGPSN
Roma	13°N 117°W	19	2011	City at the time of Lutetia present-day Rome in Italy	WGPSN
Salomacus	11°N 109°E	7	2011	City at the time of Lutetia present-day Salles (Gironde) in France	WGPSN
Salona	32°N 37°E	7.1	2011	City at the time of Lutetia present-day Solin in Croatia	WGPSN
Syracusae	39°N 32°W	7	2011	City at the time of Lutetia present-day Syracuse in Italy	WGPSN
Toletum	87°N 161°E	6	2011	City at the time of Lutetia present-day Toledo in Spain	WGPSN
Turicum	20°N 158°E	3.8	2011	City at the time of Lutetia present-day Zurich in Switzerland	WGPSN

back to top

== Pluto (14) ==
Crater	Coordinates	Diameter (km)	Approval Year	Eponym	Ref
Burney	45°N 130°E	296	2017	Venetia Burney, who suggested the name Pluto	WGPSN
Coradini	42.88°N 191.43°E	38	2022	Angioletta Coradini, Italian planetary scientist	WGPSN
Coughlin	15.24°N 150.54°E	45	2020	Thomas Boyd	WGPSN
Edgeworth	6.86°N 109.42°E	149	2021	Kenneth Edgeworth, Irish astronomer	WGPSN
Elliot	10°N 140°E	96	2017	James Elliot, an MIT researcher who pioneered the use of stellar occultations	WGPSN
Hardaway	46.85°N 140.97°E	11.07	2020	Lisa Hardaway, lead engineer of New Horizons's RALPH instrument	WGPSN
Hardie	23.82°N 141.58°E	25	2020	Robert H. Hardie, American astronomer and co-discoverer of Pluto's rotational period	WGPSN
Khare	27.85°N 94.56°E	58	2019	Bishun Khare, Indian-American atmospheric chemist who researched Pluto's tholin cycle	WGPSN
Kiladze	28.39°N 212.92°E	44.42	2019	Rolan Kiladze, Georgian astronomer who researched Pluto's orbital dynamics	WGPSN
Kowal	49.48°N 217.87°E	66	2022	Charles T. Kowal, American astronomer who discovered the ringed centaur 2060 Chiron	WGPSN
Oort	7.86°N 92.05°E	123	2021	Jan Hendrik Oort, Dutch astronomer who proposed the hypothetical Oort cloud	WGPSN
Pulfrich	77.80°N 135.99°E	37.7	2020	Carl Pulfrich, German physicist and inventor of the blink comparator, the device used to discover Pluto	WGPSN
Simonelli	12.79°N 314.76°E	286	2019	Damon Simonelli, American astronomer who researched the formation of Pluto	WGPSN
Zagar	5.74°S 155.23°E	93	2020	Francesco Zagar, Italian astronomer who studied Pluto's orbit	WGPSN

back to top

== Šteins (23) ==
Crater	Coordinates	Diameter (km)	Approval Year	Eponym	Ref
Agate	57.6°N 1.8°E	0.5	2012	Banded gemstone variety of the mineral chalcedony	WGPSN
Alexandrite	7°S 20.7°E	0.31	2012	Gemstone notable for its color change appearing green in daylight but red under incandescent light; a variety of chrysoberyl	WGPSN
Almandine	29.5°N 53.8°E	0.52	2012	Red to violet-red gemstone a variety of the mineral garnet	WGPSN
Amazonite	9.6°N 75.6°E	0.47	2012	Light bluish-green gemstone a variety of the mineral orthoclase	WGPSN
Amethyst	28.9°N 16.8°W	0.45	2012	Violet gemstone a variety of the mineral quartz	WGPSN
Aquamarine	7.2°N 120.3°E	0.37	2012	Blue-green and light blue gemstone a variety of the mineral beryl	WGPSN
Chrysoberyl	2°S 29.6°E	1.55	2012	Yellow or brownish-green gemstone the third hardest gemstone after diamond and sapphire	WGPSN
Citrine	13.7°N 19.4°W	0.61	2012	Yellow gemstone a variety of the mineral quartz	WGPSN
Diamond	54.6°S 13.4°E	2.1	2012	Rare and precious gemstone the hardest natural substance	WGPSN
Emerald	3.9°S 139.3°E	0.52	2012	Green gemstone a variety of the mineral beryl	WGPSN
Garnet	8.6°S 21.7°W	0.39	2012	Group of related minerals found in a variety of colors and often cut as gemstones	WGPSN
Jade	18°S 24.7°W	0.26	2012	Semitransparent to translucent gemstone a variety of the minerals nephrite and jadeite	WGPSN
Lapis	31.5°S 30.3°W	0.44	2012	Lapis Lazuli; gemstone formed from a rock containing a number of minerals the quality and value determined by the color and abundance of the blue mineral lazurite	WGPSN
Malachite	11.8°N 49.9°E	0.47	2012	Translucent to opaque gemstone usually banded or rich green and often found with azurite	WGPSN
Obsidian	10.6°S 43.6°E	0.51	2012	Volcanic glass used as a gemstone	WGPSN
Onyx	10.9°N 8.9°E	1	2012	Gemstone variety of the mineral chalcedony	WGPSN
Opal	1.1°N 22.2°W	0.4	2012	Non-crystalline gemstone noted for its rich play of colors when turned in the light	WGPSN
Peridot	25.1°S 24°W	0.27	2012	Green gemstone a variety of the mineral olivine	WGPSN
Sapphire	31.3°S 31.3°E	0.6	2012	All colors of gemstones of the mineral corundum (except red which is the gemstone ruby) are called sapphires	WGPSN
Topaz	7.7°S 0°E	0.65	2012	Gemstone that occurs in a wide variety of colors	WGPSN
Tourmaline	20.9°S 12.4°W	0.22	2012	Gemstone noted for its beautiful multi-colored prismatic crystals	WGPSN
Turquoise	31.6°S 113.4°E	0.47	2012	Opaque blue-to-green mineral of arid climates that has been used as a gemstone for thousands of years	WGPSN
Zircon	13.5°S 25°W	1.77	2012	Gemstone that is colorless in its pure form but also found in yellows browns and reds	WGPSN

back to top

== Vesta (90) ==
Crater	Coordinates	Diameter (km)	Approval Year	Eponym	Ref
Aconia	7.54°N 151.37°E	19	2014	Fabia Aconia Paulina; Roman aristocratic woman wife of Praetextatus (d. c. 384)	WGPSN
Aelia	14.26°S 69.2°W	4.34	2012	Aelia Oculata; Roman vestal virgin (c. 83)	WGPSN
Africana	68.99°N 14.13°W	25.43	2014	Cornelia Africana; Roman noblewoman wife of Tiberus Gracchus Major mother of Tiberus and Gaius Gracchus (c. 190-100 B.C.)	WGPSN
Albana	76.61°N 159.31°W	90.86	2012	Roman vestal virgin	WGPSN
Albia	27.85°S 78.85°E	5.79	2014	Albia Dominica; Roman noblewoman wife of Emperor Valens (c. 337–378)	WGPSN
Alypia	70.22°S 139.22°E	15.17	2014	Roman noblewoman daughter of Anthemius and Aelia Euphemia wife of Ricimer (fl. 467–472)	WGPSN
Angioletta	40.16°S 179.25°E	18.42	2014	Angioletta Coradini; Italian planetary scientist (1946–2011)	WGPSN
Antonia	58.7°S 9.22°W	16.75	2012	Famous Roman woman daughter of M. Antonius and Octavia wife of Drusus mother of Germanicus Livilla and Emperor Claudius (36 B.C. - A.D. 37)	WGPSN
Aquilia	49.41°S 169.12°W	36.82	2012	Julia Aquilia Severa; Roman vestal virgin (c. 218)	WGPSN
Arruntia	39.44°N 138.41°W	10.49	2012	Roman vestal virgin (c. 70 B.C.)	WGPSN
Bellicia	37.73°N 162.24°W	41.68	2011	Roman vestal virgin (c. 3rd century)	WGPSN
Bruttia	63.81°N 122.91°W	20.68	2014	Bruttia Crispina; Roman Empress wife of Emperor Commodus (164–191)	WGPSN
Caesonia	31.2°N 110.07°W	104.23	2014	Atia; Roman noblewoman daughter of Julius Caesar's sister mother of Emperor Augustus (85-43 B.C.)	WGPSN
Calpurnia	16.72°N 10.9°W	50.19	2011	Roman vestal virgin (c. 3rd century)	WGPSN
Cannutia	58.93°S 145.27°W	17.97	2014	Roman vestal virgin (c. 213)	WGPSN
Canuleia	33.62°S 84.52°E	11.32	2012	One of the first Roman vestal virgins	WGPSN
Caparronia	35.71°N 42.97°W	53.2	2011	Roman vestal virgin (d. 266 B.C.)	WGPSN
Charito	44.8°S 90.71°E	6.55	2014	Roman Empress daughter of military commander Lucillianus wife of Emperor Jovian (mid 4th century C.E.)	WGPSN
Claudia	1.65°S 146°E	0.57	2011	Roman vestal virgin (c. 143 B.C.)	WGPSN
Coelia	1.14°S 120.18°W	14.06	2014	Coelia Concordia; the last Roman vestal virgin and the last Vestalis Maxima (Chief Vestal) after the Temple of Vesta was closed in 391 (d. 406 A.D.)	WGPSN
Cornelia	9.37°S 15.57°E	14.9	2011	Roman vestal virgin (c. 23)	WGPSN
Cossinia	0.63°N 178.96°E	15.72	2014	Roman vestal virgin	WGPSN
Domitia	37.62°N 22.04°W	32.99	2011	Roman vestal virgin (c. 10–19)	WGPSN
Domna	11.11°S 134.07°W	13.53	2012	Julia; wife of Roman emperor Severus	WGPSN
Drusilla	15.05°S 51.22°E	20.34	2012	Julia; famous Roman woman second daughter of Germanicus and Agrippina sister of Gaius (16–38)	WGPSN
Eumachia	0.14°N 42.94°W	25.78	2012	Priestess and prominent citizen of Pompeii (c. 1st century)	WGPSN
Eusebia	42.04°S 5.69°W	23.44	2012	Famous Roman woman second wife of Constantius II	WGPSN
Eutropia	22.4°N 104.99°W	21.09	2012	Wife of Maximian (c. 324)	WGPSN
Fabia	15.53°N 55.76°E	11.62	2012	Roman vestal virgin (served as a vestal virgin from 73 to pre 58 B.C.)	WGPSN
Fausta	25.44°S 99.76°E	3.14	2014	Flavia Maxima; Roman Empress wife of Constantine I executed by him (d. 326)	WGPSN
Flavola	9.16°S 30.44°W	2.87	2014	Roman vestal virgin (c. 215)	WGPSN
Floronia	36.23°N 94.06°E	18.54	2011	Roman vestal virgin (d. 216 B.C.)	WGPSN
Fonteia	53.25°S 68.59°W	20.61	2012	Roman vestal virgin (c. 69 B.C.)	WGPSN
Fulvia	26.13°S 67.35°W	16.73	2014	Wife of Clodius Curio and Antony	WGPSN
Fundania	57.62°N 74.98°W	29.23	2014	Annia Fundania Faustina; Roman noblewoman cousin of M. Aurelius victim of Commodus (d. 192)	WGPSN
Galeria	29.82°S 18.38°E	21.77	2012	Galeria Fundana; wife of Emperor Vitellius (c. 1st century)	WGPSN
Gegania	4.05°N 149.23°W	22.33	2011	Roman vestal virgin	WGPSN
Graecina	37.45°S 122.99°W	11.93	2014	Pomponia Graecina; Roman noblewoman married to the consul Aulus Plautius (d. A.D. 83)	WGPSN
Helena	41.51°S 87.45°W	22.06	2011	Flavia Iulia Helena Augusta; mother of Constantine the Great	WGPSN
Herennia	72.42°S 10.33°E	22.33	2014	Herennia Etruscilla; Roman Empress wife of Emperor Decius mother of Emperors Etruscus Herrenius and Hostilian (c. 250)	WGPSN
Hortensia	46.85°S 165.38°E	29.45	2014	Daughter of consul and advocate Quintus Hortensius (fl. c. 50 B.C.); she was known as a skilled orator	WGPSN
Iuinia	35.58°S 121.78°W	3.03	2014	Roman vestal virgin (c. 107)	WGPSN
Justina	34.41°S 107.88°E	7.62	2012	Famous Roman woman second wife of Emperor Valentinian	WGPSN
Laelia	46.82°S 69.55°W	8.89	2012	Roman vestal virgin (c. 62)	WGPSN
Laeta	14.9°N 30.1°W	1.37	2014	Clodia; Roman vestal virgin (c. 213)	WGPSN
Laurentia	28.15°S 92.8°E	11.48	2014	Acca; mythical woman wife of the shepherd Faustulus in Roman mythology adoptive mother of Romulus and Remus	WGPSN
Lepida	16.74°N 96.76°E	42.9	2012	Roman vestal virgin (c. 25)	WGPSN
Licinia	23.34°N 167.35°E	24.05	2012	Roman vestal virgin (c. 140-113 B.C.)	WGPSN
Lollia	37.36°S 117.67°W	4.9	2014	Lollia Paulina; Roman woman of distinguished ancestry and great wealth Roman Empress as the third wife of Caligula (15–49)	WGPSN
Longina	36.96°N 20.65°E	17.65	2014	Domitia; Roman empress wife of Emperor Domitian Augusta of Rome (c. 51–130)	WGPSN
Lucilla	75.96°S 60.88°W	19.3	2014	Annia; Roman Empress mother of M. Aurelius married to Emperors L. Verus and then to Ti. Claudius (c. 150–182)	WGPSN
Mamilia	48.39°N 82.09°E	35.67	2012	Roman vestal virgin (c. 240)	WGPSN
Marcia	8.98°N 20.45°W	67.6	2011	Roman vestal virgin (d. 113 B.C.)	WGPSN
Mariamne	68.44°S 9.27°W	30.33	2014	Second wife of Herod king of Roman province Judea known for her great beauty (c. 60-29 B.C.)	WGPSN
Metrodora	59.43°S 100.54°E	23.99	2014	Claudia Metrodora; Greek woman with Roman citizenship prominent public benefactor (mid 1st century A.D.)	WGPSN
Minervina	16.85°N 160.71°W	18.34	2014	The first wife of the Roman Emperor Constantine the Great mother of Crispus (early 4th century)	WGPSN
Minucia	20.2°N 2.8°W	23.15	2011	Roman vestal virgin (c. 337 B.C.)	WGPSN
Myia	50.53°S 103.66°W	2.59	2012	Daughter of Pythagoras and Theano wife of Milon of Crotona	WGPSN
Numisia	7.48°S 37.25°E	29.94	2011	Roman vestal virgin (c. 204)	WGPSN
Occia	15.47°S 168.48°E	7.34	2012	Roman vestal virgin (served as vestal virgin from c. 40 B.C. to A.D. 19)	WGPSN
Octavia	3.3°S 62.79°W	30.62	2012	Roman vestal virgin (third century A.D.)	WGPSN
Oppia	7.89°S 99.08°E	36.67	2011	Roman vestal virgin (d. 483 B.C.)	WGPSN
Paculla	64.22°S 151.15°E	22.34	2014	Paculla Annia; Campanian (Southern Italy) priestess of Bacchus whose reforms radically altered the Bacchanalian ritual in ancient Rome (fl. c. 188 B.C.)	WGPSN
Paulina	10.92°N 133.11°E	18.13	2012	Aurelia; priestess for life of asylum-granting Artemis Pergaia built hydreion at her own expense	WGPSN
Perpennia	23.03°S 101.25°W	21.36	2014	Roman vestal virgin (c. 100-70 B.C.)	WGPSN
Pinaria	29.54°S 178.37°W	41.76	2011	Roman vestal virgin (c. 600 B.C.)	WGPSN
Placidia	19.24°N 78.62°W	14.75	2014	Galla; daughter of the Roman Emperor Theodorius I wife of Athualf King of the Visigoths and Constantius III Roman Emperor (390–450)	WGPSN
Plancia	61.56°N 16.09°W	18.48	2014	Plancia Magna; daughter of Roman Senator Varus wife of Tertullus benefactress and patron of Perga the capital of the Roman province of Pamphylia in Asia Minor (1st-2nd century A.D.)	WGPSN
Pomponia	70.2°N 97.42°W	59.07	2012	Roman vestal virgin (c. 213)	WGPSN
Portia	0.91°N 168.83°W	11.44	2014	Daughter of Roman statesman Cato Uticensis second wife of M. Brutus (c. 70-43/42 B.C.)	WGPSN
Postumia	33.84°N 33.77°E	195.89	2014	Roman vestal virgin (c. 420 B.C.)	WGPSN
Publicia	14.53°N 125.64°W	15.79	2012	Flavia Publicia; Roman vestal virgin (c. 213)	WGPSN
Rheasilvia	71.95°S 86.3°E	450	2011	Rhea Silvia Roman vestal virgin mother of Romulus and Remus (c. 770 B.C.)	WGPSN
Rubria	7.32°S 168.34°E	10.27	2012	Roman vestal virgin (c. 54)	WGPSN
Rufillia	12.92°S 71.29°W	15.79	2014	Roman vestal virgin (c. 250–301)	WGPSN
Scantia	29.63°N 64.65°E	18.61	2012	Roman vestal virgin (c. 40 B.C.-A.D. 23)	WGPSN
Sentia	38.39°S 170.75°E	16.54	2014	Amaesia Sentia; mentioned by Valerius Maximus as an instance of a female who pleaded her own cause before the praetor; called “Androgyne” for having a man's spirit with a female body	WGPSN
Serena	20.43°S 89.29°W	18.47	2012	Roman noblewoman niece of Emperor Theodosius (c. 400)	WGPSN
Severina	75.41°S 88.45°W	34.74	2011	Roman vestal virgin (c. 240)	WGPSN
Sextilia	39°S 64.07°W	19.48	2011	Roman vestal virgin (d. 274 B.C.)	WGPSN
Sossia	36.78°S 75.76°E	8.11	2012	Roman vestal virgin	WGPSN
Tarpeia	69.47°S 179.3°E	40.29	2011	Roman vestal virgin	WGPSN
Teia	3.44°S 61.06°E	6.69	2012	Teia Euphrosyne Ruffina Roman vestal virgin (c. 200)	WGPSN
Torquata	46.45°N 143.78°E	34.73	2012	Roman vestal virgin (c. 48)	WGPSN
Tuccia	39.86°S 13.19°W	11.65	2011	Roman vestal virgin	WGPSN
Urbinia	29.88°S 66.26°E	24.25	2011	Roman vestal virgin	WGPSN
Varronilla	29.62°N 179.58°E	158.45	2014	Roman vestal virgin (c. 10–83)	WGPSN
Veneneia	47.93°S 54.32°W	400	2012	One of the first Roman vestal virgins	WGPSN
Vettenia	4.8°N 130.69°W	18.89	2014	Roman vestal virgin (c. 200)	WGPSN
Vibidia	26.96°S 10.3°E	7.1	2011	Roman vestal virgin (c. 48)	WGPSN

back to top
