= Samhain Catenae =

Series of craters on Ceres

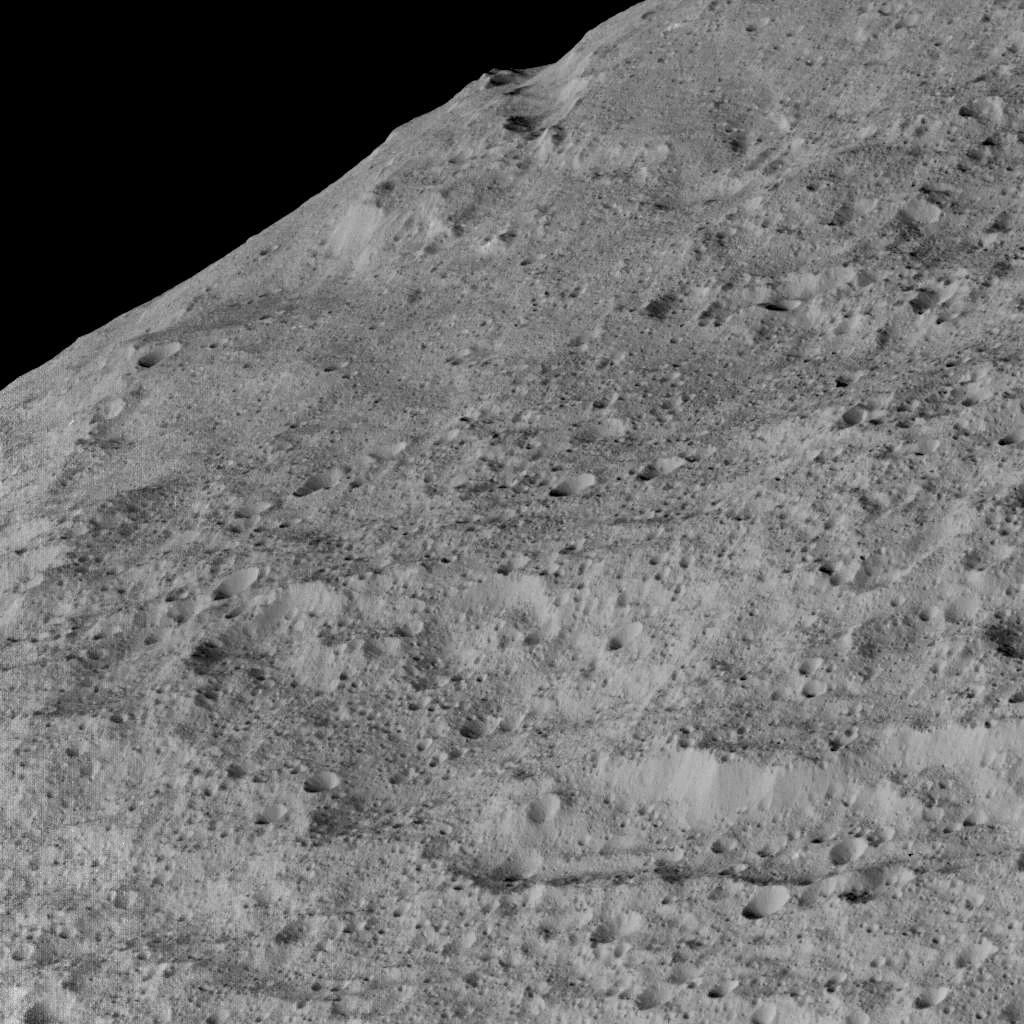
- An image of Samhain Catenae. It is the line of craters along the bottom of the image.
- Feature type: Catenae
- Location: Ceres
- Coordinates: 2.75°S 107.15°W
- Diameter: ~715km
- Discoverer: Dawn spacecraft team 2015
- Eponym: Samhain, Gaelic festival for the end of the harvest season in October and November.

Samhain Catenae is a crater chain on the surface of the dwarf planet and large asteroid Ceres. It is made up of a series of 6 linear pit chains totaling a distance of 1211 km. It is the largest known catenae on the dwarf planet. It is located to the West of Liberalia Mons and to the East of Homowo Regio. It consists of the area between the Occator and Urvara/Yalode craters.

== Etymology ==
Samhain Catenae is named after the Gaelic festival Samhain which was celebrated in present day Ireland and Scotland for 7 days during October and November to celebrate the end of the harvesting season between the Autumn Equinox and Winter Solstice. It was originally named Samhain Catena in December 2015 because it was believed to only consist of one crater, however on June 20, 2016 it was renamed to Samhain Catenae.

== Geology ==
It is believed that the Samhain Catenae was formed through asymmetric convection and a diapirs similar as what is seen in the Hanami Planum. The thickness of the Catenae is about 36 miles deep compared to the 27 mile average over the whole dwarf planet. There is very little mineralogical difference between the catenae and the rest of Ceres further adding evidence to its tectonic origin.

== See also ==
- List of geological features on Ceres
- Geology of Ceres
