= Kārlis Šteins =

Latvian astronomer

Kārlis Šteins (October 13, 1911 – April 4, 1983) was a Latvian and Soviet astronomer and populariser of this science.

== Biography ==
Šteins was born on October 13, 1911 in Kazan, Russian Empire. In 1925 he finished the Riga 2nd Secondary school. In 1929 he started the studies in University of Latvia, the Faculty of Mathematics and Natural Science. In 1934 he graduated from the University of Latvia. In 1933 he was practicing in Kraków, Poland, at Kraków Astronomical Observatory under supervision of Tadeusz Banachiewicz, and continued there until 1936. In 1933 he calculated the orbit of asteroid 1933 OP, discovered by Karl Wilhelm Reinmuth, and named it 1284 Latvia; this is the first minor planet to bear a Latvia-related name. After 1951 he worked at the University of Latvia as professor at the department of Theoretical Physics. He became an associate professor (docent) in 1956, and professor in 1966. He became a member of the IAU in 1958, and of the Astronomy council of the USSR Academy of Science in 1967.

Karlis Steins enriched astronomy with his research in cosmogony, celestial mechanics, and problems of precise time. He had over 120 publications. He obtained his Ph.D. at Pulkovo Observatory in 1963 by defending his thesis on the evolution of comet orbits.

Asteroid 2867 Šteins discovered in 1969 by Soviet astronomer Nikolai Stepanovich Chernykh, and imaged by the Rosetta spacecraft in 2008, is named in honor of Šteins.
