= Annona (crater) =

Crater on Ceres

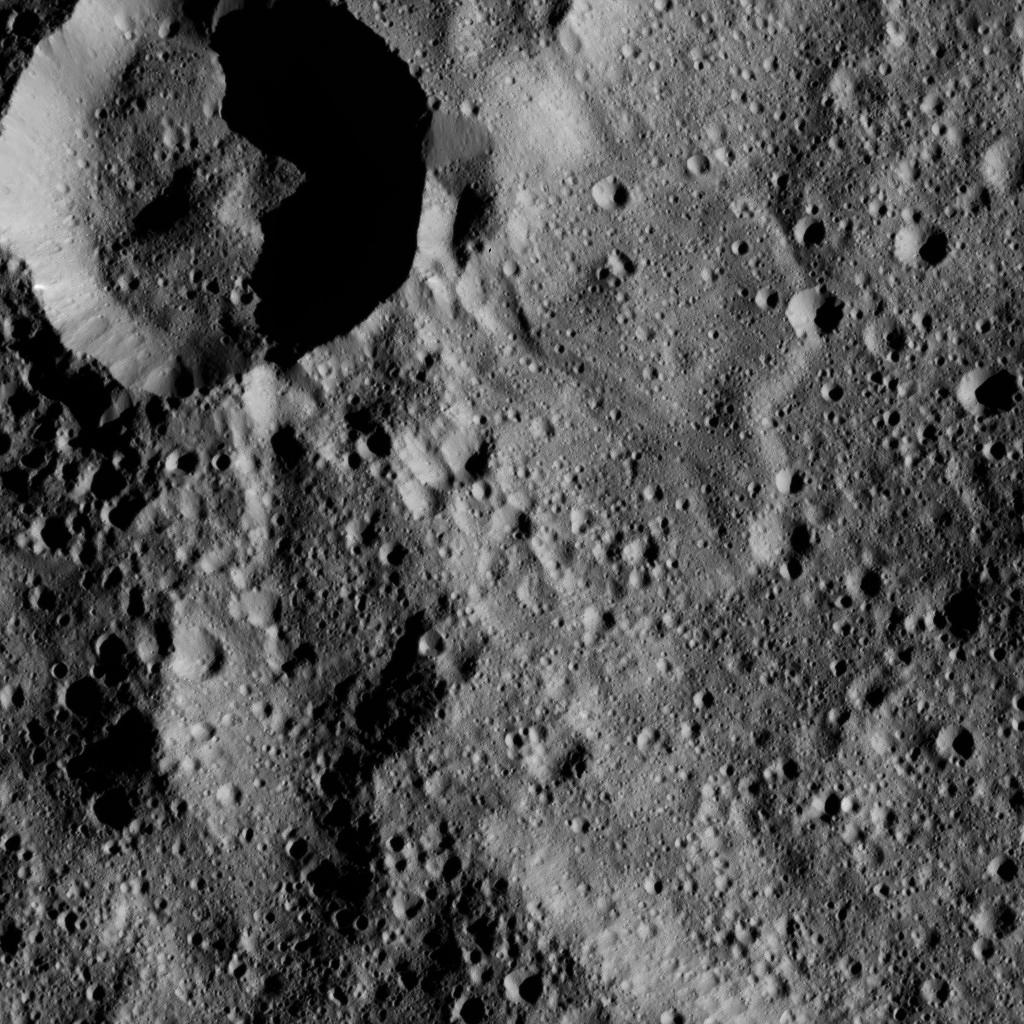
- An image of Annona and its surrounding area.
- Feature type: Crater
- Location: Sintana Quadrangle, Ceres
- Coordinates: 48.14°S 8.43°E
- Diameter: ~60km
- Discoverer: Dawn spacecraft team 2015
- Eponym: Annona (mythology), god of the harvest in Ancient Rome.

Annona is a crater on the surface of the dwarf planet and large asteroid Ceres. It is a corner of the Sintana Quadrangle, located northwest of the namesake crater. It is named after the Roman Mythology agricultural deity of the harvest much like other craters on Ceres. Its name was officiated on December 14, 2015 by the International Astronomical Union.

Annona is a preservation class 3 crater, meaning that it is a crater with a flat bottom and its walls are degraded. It is believed that this degradation was due to the formation of a young crater along the rim of Annona.

== See also ==
- List of geological features on Ceres
- Geology of Ceres
- List of craters on minor planets
