= Kiladze =

Kiladze (Georgian: კილაძე) is a Georgian surname. It may refer to

- Iago Kiladze (born 1986), Georgian (until 2006) and Ukrainian (since 2007) professional boxer
- Nika Kiladze (1988–2014), Georgian football player
- Rolan Kiladze (1931–2010), Georgian astronomer
