= 2867 Šteins =

Main-belt asteroid

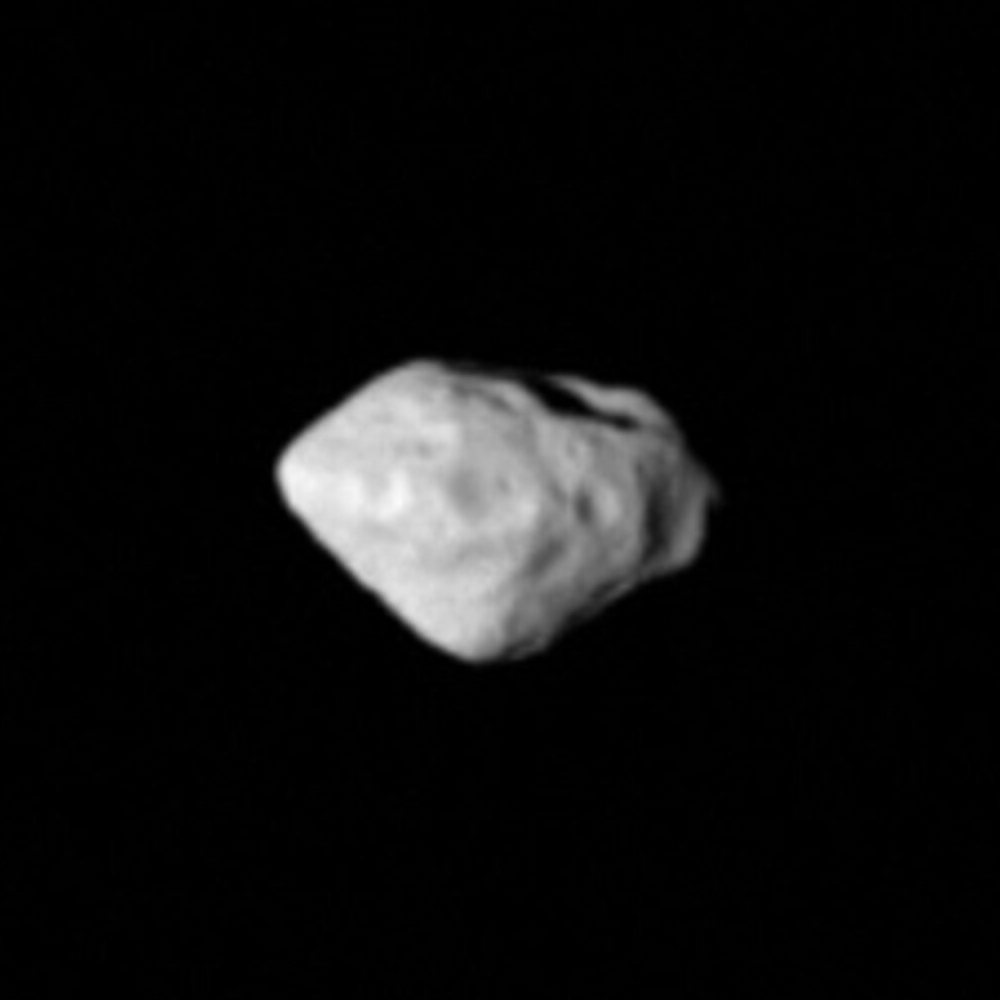
- Šteins imaged by Rosetta

Discovery
- Discovered by: N. Chernykh
- Discovery site: Crimean Astrophysical Obs.
- Discovery date: 4 November 1969

Designations
- Pronunciation: /ˈsteɪns/
- Named after: Kārlis Šteins
- Alternative designations: 1969 VC; 1954 QL; 1979 FJ_{4}; 1980 VV_{1}; 1980 WB
- Minor planet category: main-belt (inner); background

Orbital characteristics
- Epoch 23 March 2018 (JD 2458200.5)
- Uncertainty parameter 0
- Observation arc: 66.47 yr (24,279 d)
- Aphelion: 2.7081 AU
- Perihelion: 2.0185 AU
- Semi-major axis: 2.3633 AU
- Eccentricity: 0.1459
- Orbital period (sidereal): 3.63 yr (1,327 d)
- Mean anomaly: 182.24°
- Mean motion: 0° 16^{m} 16.68^{s} / day
- Inclination: 9.9354°
- Longitude of ascending node: 55.366°
- Argument of perihelion: 251.08°

Physical characteristics
- Dimensions: 6.83 km × 5.70 km × 4.42 km
- Mean diameter: 4.92±0.40 km 5.160±0.167 km
- Synodic rotation period: 6.049 h (Note: Lightcurve plot of 2867 Steins, Palmer Divide Observatory by B. D. Warner (2004). Rotation period of 6.05±0.01 hours with a brightness amplitude of 0.30 mag. Quality code is 3-. Summary figures for (2867) Šteins at the LCDB.)
- Geometric albedo: 0.300; 0.34; 0.40
- Spectral type: E V–R = 0.510±0.030
- Absolute magnitude (H): 12.7; 13.36; 13.36±0.07

2867 Šteins (provisional designation 1969 VC) is an irregular, diamond-shaped background asteroid from the inner regions of the asteroid belt. Classified as an E-type asteroid, it is approximately 5 kilometers (3.1 miles) in diameter. It was discovered on 4 November 1969 by Soviet astronomer Nikolai Chernykh at the Crimean Astrophysical Observatory in Nauchnij on the Crimean peninsula. In September 2008, European Space Agency's (ESA) spacecraft Rosetta flew by Šteins, making it one of few minor planets ever visited by a spacecraft. The bright E-type asteroid features 23 named craters and has a rotation period of 6.05 hours. It was named for Soviet Latvian astronomer Kārlis Šteins.

== Orbit and classification ==
Šteins is a non-family asteroid from the main belt's background population. It orbits the Sun in the inner asteroid belt at a distance of 2.0–2.7 Astronomical units (AU) once every 3 years and 8 months (1,327 days; semi-major axis of 2.36 AU). Its orbit has an eccentricity of 0.15 and an inclination of 10° with respect to the ecliptic. The body's observation arc begins with a precovery, taken at the Palomar Observatory in November 1951, or 18 years prior to its official discovery observation.

== Naming ==
This minor planet was named in memory of Kārlis Šteins (1911–1983), a Latvian and Soviet astronomer. He was a long-time observatory director at the University of Latvia in Riga and designed astronomical instruments. Šteins is known for his work on cometary cosmogony and the study of Earth's rotation. The official naming citation was published by the Minor Planet Center on 18 September 1986 (M.P.C. 11157).

=== Features on Šteins ===
On 11 May 2012, IAU's Working Group for Planetary System Nomenclature announced a naming system for geographical features on Šteins. Inspired by the asteroid's gem-like shape, its crater are given the English-language names of precious stones, with the largest being named Diamond crater (see below).

Except for the montes of Mercury and the lunar maria (and proposed for 2 Pallas and 7 Iris), the craters of Šteins are the only features in the Solar System whose names are not derived from proper nouns. In addition, a distinct region on the asteroid has been named Chernykh Regio after the discoverer, Nikolai Chernykh.

== Physical characteristics ==
A study published in 2006 by astronomers at the European Southern Observatory showed that Šteins is an E-type asteroid with a diameter of approximately 4.6 kilometers. After the Rosetta flyby, the ESA described Šteins as a "diamond in the sky", as it has a wide body that tapers into a point. The wide section is dominated by the large Diamond crater with a diameter of 2.1 kilometers, which surprised scientists, who were at first amazed the asteroid survived such an impact, while later it turned out that the crater-to-body diameter ratio of 0.79 is in fact not abnormally large as it follows an already established trend. Besides its irregular shape, it does not have any moons.

=== Diameter and albedo ===
According to the survey carried out by the NEOWISE mission of NASA's Wide-field Infrared Survey Explorer and observations by the Spitzer Space Telescope, Šteins measures 5.16 and 4.92 kilometers in diameter and its surface has an albedo of 0.30 and 0.34, respectively. Its overall Bond albedo is 0.24 ± 0.01. In 2012, the photographs of Šteins taken by Rosetta using stereophotoclinometry allowed scientists to determine that the asteroid's dimensions are 6.83 × 5.70 × 4.42 kilometers, which equates to a mean diameter in volume of 5.26 km. The Collaborative Asteroid Lightcurve Link adopts an albedo of 0.34 and a diameter of 4.9 kilometers with an absolute magnitude of 13.36.

=== Rotation ===
Studying the asteroid with Rosetta spacecraft onboard OSIRIS cameras shortly before its flyby showed via a lightcurve analysis that Šteins has a rotation period of 6.052±0.007 hours. The results of the rotational lightcurve agree with ground-based photometric observations of Šteins with a period of 6.049 hours and a brightness amplitude between 0.18 and 0.31 magnitude (U=3/3).

A lightcurve inversion also modeled a concurring sidereal period of 6.04681 hours and determined a spin axis at (250.0°, −89.0°) in ecliptic coordinates (λ, β). The modeling was done by compiling a set of 26 previously obtained visible lightcurves.

== Exploration ==
=== Rosetta flyby ===
Animation of Rosetta's trajectory from 2 March 2004 to 9 September 2016 Rosetta · 67P · Earth · Mars · 21 Lutetia · 2867 Šteins

On 5 September 2008, the Rosetta space probe flew by Šteins at a distance of 800 km and a relatively slow speed of 8.6 km/s. Despite the short duration of this encounter (approximately 7 minutes in total), a great amount of data was obtained by the 15 scientific instruments operating on board the Rosetta spacecraft. This was the first of two planned asteroid flybys performed by the probe, with the second being to the much larger 21 Lutetia in 2010. The timing of the flyby meant that the asteroid was illuminated by the Sun from the perspective of the spacecraft, making the transmitted images clear. The European Space Operations Centre streamed a press conference on Šteins later that day.

== See also ==
- List of craters on minor planets
- List of minor planets and comets visited by spacecraft
