= Hanami Planum =

Highland region on Ceres

- Feature type: Planum; highland region
- Location: Ceres
- Coordinates: 15.00°N 130.00°W
- Diameter: 555 km
- Peak: 6 km
- Discoverer: Dawn
- Eponym: Hanami

Hanami Planum, formerly named Erntedank Planum, is a highland region on the dwarf planet and giant asteroid Ceres.

== Observation and naming ==
On 5 March 2015, NASA's Dawn spacecraft entered orbit around Ceres, observing and mapping its surface features in detail for the first time. The plateau was originally given the name Erntedank Planum by the International Astronomical Union (IAU) on 4 December 2015, after the German thanksgiving festival of Erntedankfest. However, the name was dropped on 20 June 2016 and replaced with Hanami Planum. The new name comes from Hanami, the Japanese custom of viewing cherry blossoms.

== Geography and geology ==
Hanami Planum is a highland area centered near 15°N, 130°W, primarily placing it inside the Occator quadrangle. Spanning about 555 kilometres (345 mi) and rising as high as 6 kilometres (3.7 mi), it is the only discrete topographic high on Ceres It is the third largest geological feature on Ceres, after Vendimia Planitia and Samhain Catenae; the latter broadly coincides with Hanami Planum. Several major named craters occupy the highland, including Nepen, Azacca, Lociyo, and the bright Occator. Other major craters border Hanami Planum, such as Kirnis to the east and Ezinu to the northwest.

Hanami Planum is associated with a broad, distinct negative isostatic gravity anomaly, meaning that local gravity is weaker than normal. The negative gravity anomalies suggest that Hanami Planum lies in a region of low-density material, with a mass deficit of 97.1+1.6
−1.5×10^{16} kg, ~0.1% the mass of Ceres. The region includes the most extreme negative anomaly observed on Ceres, with a strength of < –95 mGal southeast of Occator at 12°N, 113°W. This anomaly is associated with a 70 by 30 kilometres (43 mi × 19 mi) dome that rises 2–3 kilometres (1.2–1.9 mi) above the surrounding terrain. Another distinct local anomaly crosses Samhain Catenae. It overlaps with a large dome within Kirnis and a 2 kilometres (1.2 mi) high dome to the southwest.

== See also ==
- Yamor Mons – A mountain on Ceres whose name was changed from Ysolo Mons in 2016
