= Yalode (crater) =

Large crater on Ceres

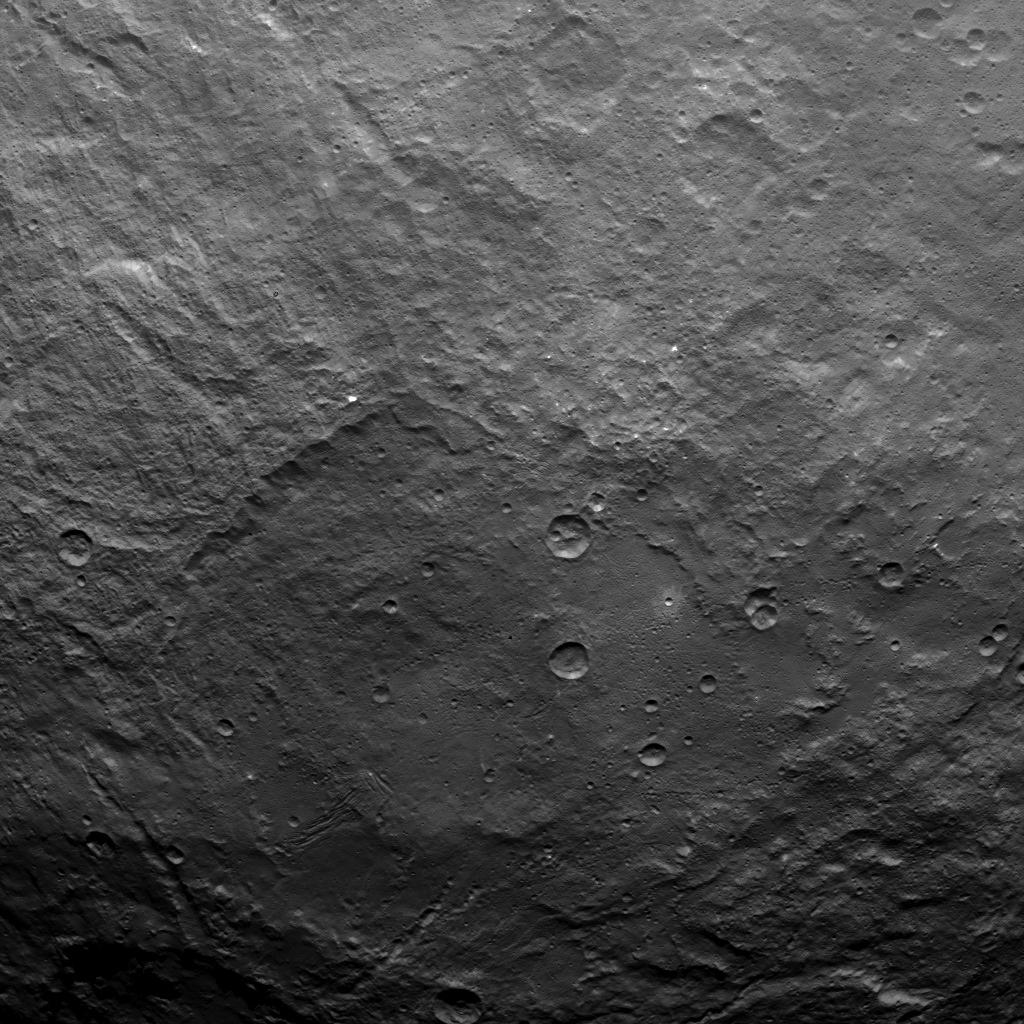
- An image of Yalode and surrounding regions. Yalode is heavily degraded, only barely discernible as a flattened region at the bottom-center of the image
- Feature type: Impact crater
- Location: Yalode Quadrangle, Ceres
- Coordinates: 42.58°S 292.48°E
- Diameter: 271 km
- Discoverer: Dawn
- Eponym: Yalodé

Yalode (/jəˈloʊdi/) is the second-largest confirmed impact basin on the dwarf planet Ceres, after Kerwan. It is located adjacent to another large crater, Urvara, and serves as the namesake for the Yalode Quadrange. Yalode named after the Dahomeyan (Fon) deity of the yam harvest, Yalodé; the name Yalode was officially approved by the International Astronomical Union (IAU) on 3 July 2015.

== Geology ==
Yalode is a heavily degraded impact basin, hosting numerous smaller craters such as Besua. Yalode is geologically homogeneous, with its interior compositionally similar to surrounding areas. Yalode is itself superimposed by the Urvara basin, the third-largest crater on Ceres; both are surrounded by extensive ejecta deposits.

Yalode and the regions surrounding it appear to be heavily tectonized. The floor of Yalode basin features parallel fractures that are larger and more developed than those found in other large impact basins on Ceres. The fractures in Yalode appear to have formed in at least two distinct generations and are concentrated along its basin rim. The parallel nature of the fractures are possibly representative of horst and graben faulting from extensional stresses and tilted crust blocks. Surrounding Yalode is a vast network of pit chains, Samhain Catenae. The pit chains of Samhain Catenae are oriented roughly radially to Yalode. Despite this, Samhain Catenae does not appear to be created by ejecta thrown out from the impact event that created Yalode (the mechanism which the radial crater chains of Mare Orientale were formed). Instead, Samhain Catenae may be a network of extensional faults, created as material below Yalode upwelled. This process would also explain the unusually wide nature of Yalode's interior floor fractures.

== See also ==
- List of geological features on Ceres
