= Coniraya (crater) =

Crater on the dwarf planet Ceres

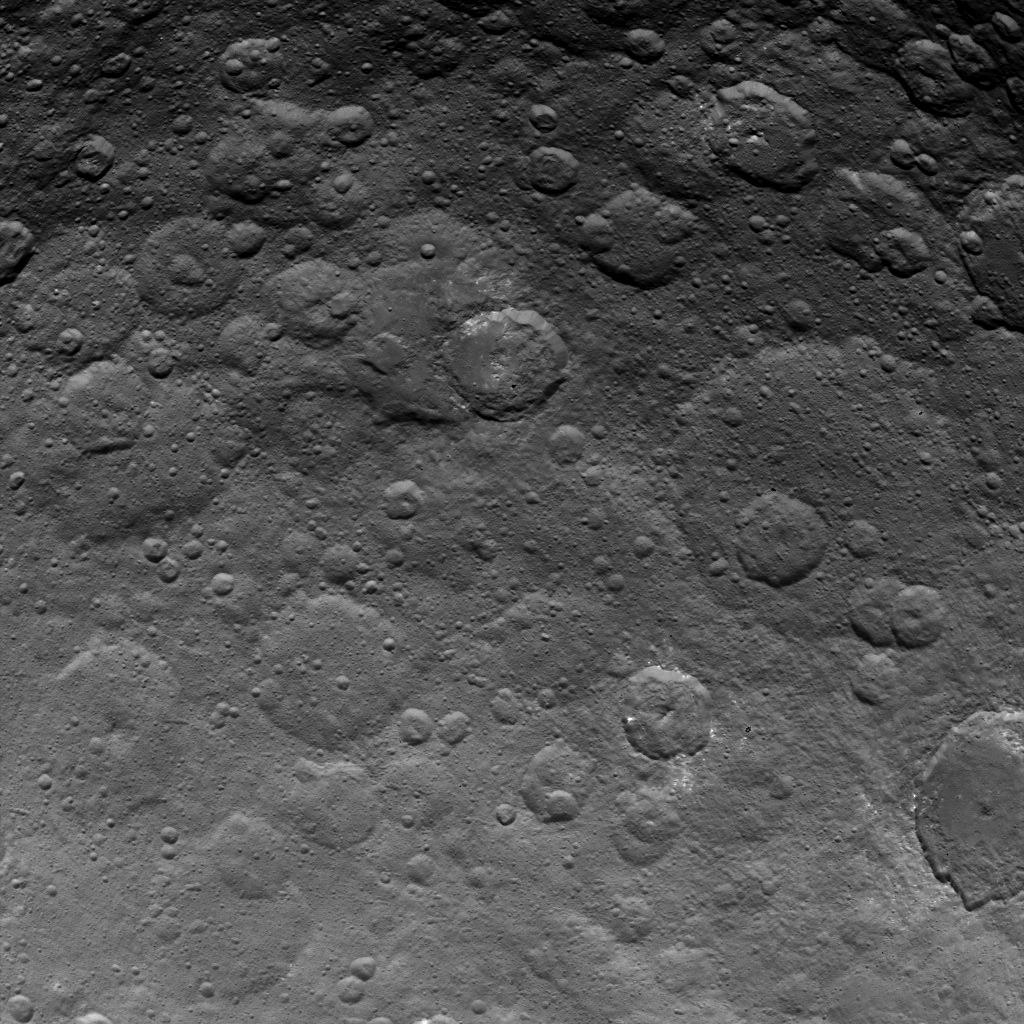
- Coniraya (center right, overlain by three smaller craters). Gaue is at lower right, cut-off by the edge of the image.
- Location: Ceres
- Coordinates: 39.86°N 65.51°E
- Diameter: c. 135 kilometres (84 mi)
- Depth: c. 500 meters
- Age: c. 1.3 billion years
- Discoverer: Dawn
- Eponym: Coniraya Viracocha, Incan lunar deity

Coniraya is a large, shallow impact crater on the dwarf planet Ceres. It is the namesake for the Coniraya Quadrangle.

== Naming ==
The crater is named after the Incan lunar and fertility deity, Coniraya Viracocha (Kon Iraya Wiraqocha), who came to earth at Huarochirí (Waruchiri), and created villages, terraced fields, and irrigation canals. The name was officially approved by the International Astronomical Union (IAU) on 3 July 2015.

== Geology ==
Coniraya is an unusually shallow crater; despite having a diameter of roughly 135 kilometres (84 miles), it is only 500 metres (1,600 feet) deep. This is in contrast to the neighboring crater Vinotonus, which is similar in size and age yet ten times deeper. The shallow depth of Coniraya may have been caused by viscous relaxation, though only if Ceres's crust at the impact site was unusually enriched in water ice. The impact which created Coniraya was caused by a large body travelling an unusually low speed. Coniraya is estimated to be around 1.3 billion years old despite its degraded state.
