= 1284 Latvia =

Main-belt asteroid

Discovery
- Discovered by: K. Reinmuth
- Discovery site: Heidelberg Obs.
- Discovery date: 27 July 1933

Designations
- Named after: Latvia (Republic of Latvia)
- Alternative designations: 1933 OP · 1925 WK; 1931 DW · 1933 QP; 1950 RL
- Minor planet category: main-belt · (middle)

Orbital characteristics
- Epoch 16 February 2017 (JD 2457800.5)
- Uncertainty parameter 0
- Observation arc: 83.45 yr (30,481 days)
- Aphelion: 3.0967 AU
- Perihelion: 2.1952 AU
- Semi-major axis: 2.6459 AU
- Eccentricity: 0.1704
- Orbital period (sidereal): 4.30 yr (1,572 days)
- Mean anomaly: 78.834°
- Mean motion: 0° 13^{m} 44.4^{s} / day
- Inclination: 10.874°
- Longitude of ascending node: 302.96°
- Argument of perihelion: 114.40°

Physical characteristics
- Dimensions: 33.27±7.09 km 36.81±1.2 km (IRAS:18); 41.128±0.457 km 41.47±0.52 km 45.19±0.74 km 47.255±0.627 km
- Synodic rotation period: 9.55±0.01 h 9.552±0.001 h 9.644±0.002 h 18 h
- Geometric albedo: 0.0634±0.0058; 0.069±0.011; 0.083±0.003; 0.1045±0.007 (IRAS:18); 0.13±0.06
- Spectral type: B–V = 0.768; U–B = 0.353; T (Tholen), L (SMASS) · L
- Absolute magnitude (H): 10.20±0.17 · 10.23 · 10.24

1284 Latvia, provisional designation 1933 OP, is a rare-type asteroid from the middle region of the asteroid belt, approximately 37 kilometers in diameter. It was discovered on 27 July 1933, by German astronomer Karl Reinmuth at Heidelberg Observatory in southern Germany, and named after the Republic of Latvia.

== Orbit and classification ==
Latvia orbits the Sun in the middle main-belt at a distance of 2.2–3.1 AU once every 4 years and 4 months (1,572 days). Its orbit has an eccentricity of 0.17 and an inclination of 11° with respect to the ecliptic.

It was first identified as 1925 WK at Moscow Observatory (105) in 1925, and then as 1931 DW at Lowell Observatory in 1931. The body's observation arc begins with its official discovery observation at Heidelberg in 1933.

== Physical characteristics ==
=== Spectral type ===
Latvia is classified as a rare T and L type asteroid in the Tholen and SMASS taxonomy schemes, respectively. Both indicate a featureless spectra of a dark and reddish body.

=== Rotation period ===
The current best rated rotational lightcurve of Latvia was obtained by the "Spanish Photometric Asteroid Analysis Group" (OBAS) in September 2015. Lightcurve analysis gave it a rotation period of 9.55 hours with a brightness variation of 0.23 magnitude (U=3-).

Previous photometric observations by James W. Brinsfield at Via Capote Observatory (G69) and French amateur astronomer Laurent Bernasconi gave a period of 9.552 and 9.644 hours with an amplitude of 0.10 and 0.21 magnitude, respectively (U=2/2). The first rotational lightcurve obtained by Richard P. Binzel in the 1980s gave a twice a long period solution of 18 hours (U=1).

=== Diameter and albedo ===
According to the surveys carried out by the Infrared Astronomical Satellite IRAS, the Japanese Akari satellite, and NASA's Wide-field Infrared Survey Explorer with its subsequent NEOWISE mission, Latvia measures between 33.27 and 41.47 kilometers in diameter, and its surface has an albedo between 0.083 and 0.13 (without preliminary results). The Collaborative Asteroid Lightcurve Link adopts the results by IRAS, that is an albedo of 0.1045 and a diameter of 36.81 kilometers with an absolute magnitude of 10.24.

== Naming ==
This minor planet was named after the Republic of Latvia. Naming citation was first mentioned in The Names of the Minor Planets by Paul Herget in 1955 (H 118).
