= Nawish (crater) =

Crater on Ceres

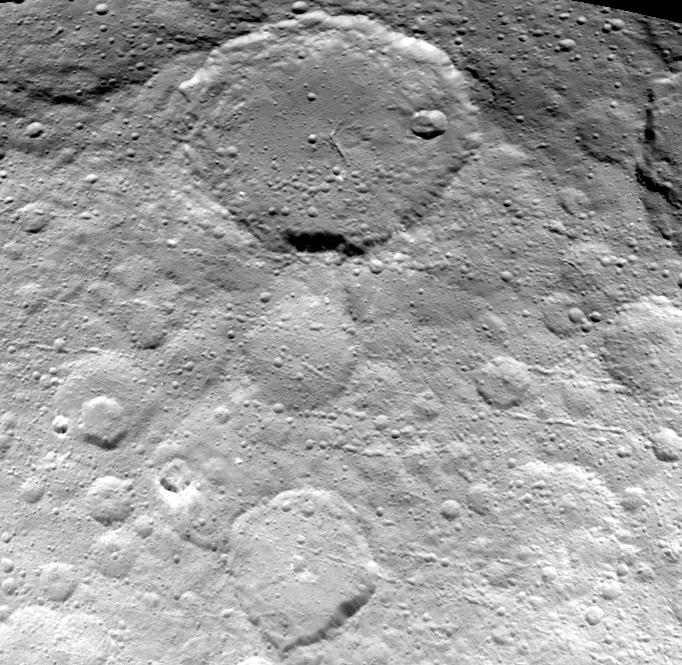
- Nawish (bottom) and Ezinu (top). Nawish's non-circular shape is apparent, likely due to multiple landslides shaping its crater rim
- Location: Nawish Quadrangle, Ceres
- Coordinates: 18.28°N 193.79°E
- Diameter: 77 kilometres (48 mi)
- Discoverer: Dawn
- Eponym: Acoma guardian of the field

Nawish is an impact crater on the dwarf planet Ceres. It is named after the Acoma guardian of the field. The name was officially approved by the International Astronomical Union (IAU) on 3 July 2015. It is the namesake of the Nawish Quadrangle.

Nawish is medium in size, at roughly 77 kilometres (48 miles) in diameter. In contrast to most craters, its shape is not circular. This is likely the result of mass wasting processes such as landslides that collapsed sections of the crater wall. As with most craters of its size on Ceres, Nawish has a central peak; its central peak is roughly 20 kilometres (12 miles) wide and 1 kilometre (0.62 miles) tall, and it hosts a central pit that is roughly 8 kilometres (5.0 miles) wide and deeper than Nawish's crater floor by about a kilometer.

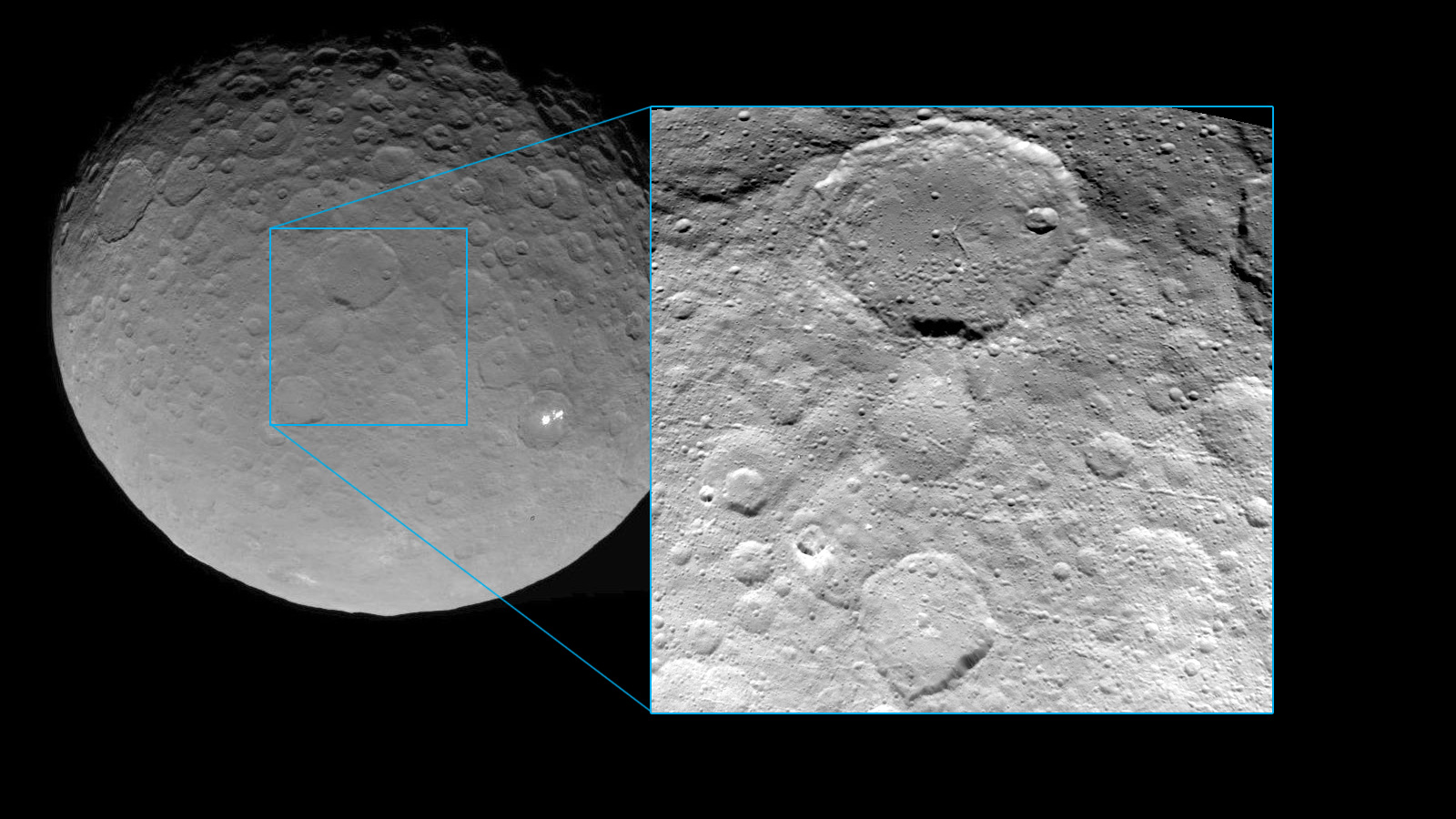
Ezinu and Nawish craters in context
