= Liberalia Mons =

Mountain on Ceres

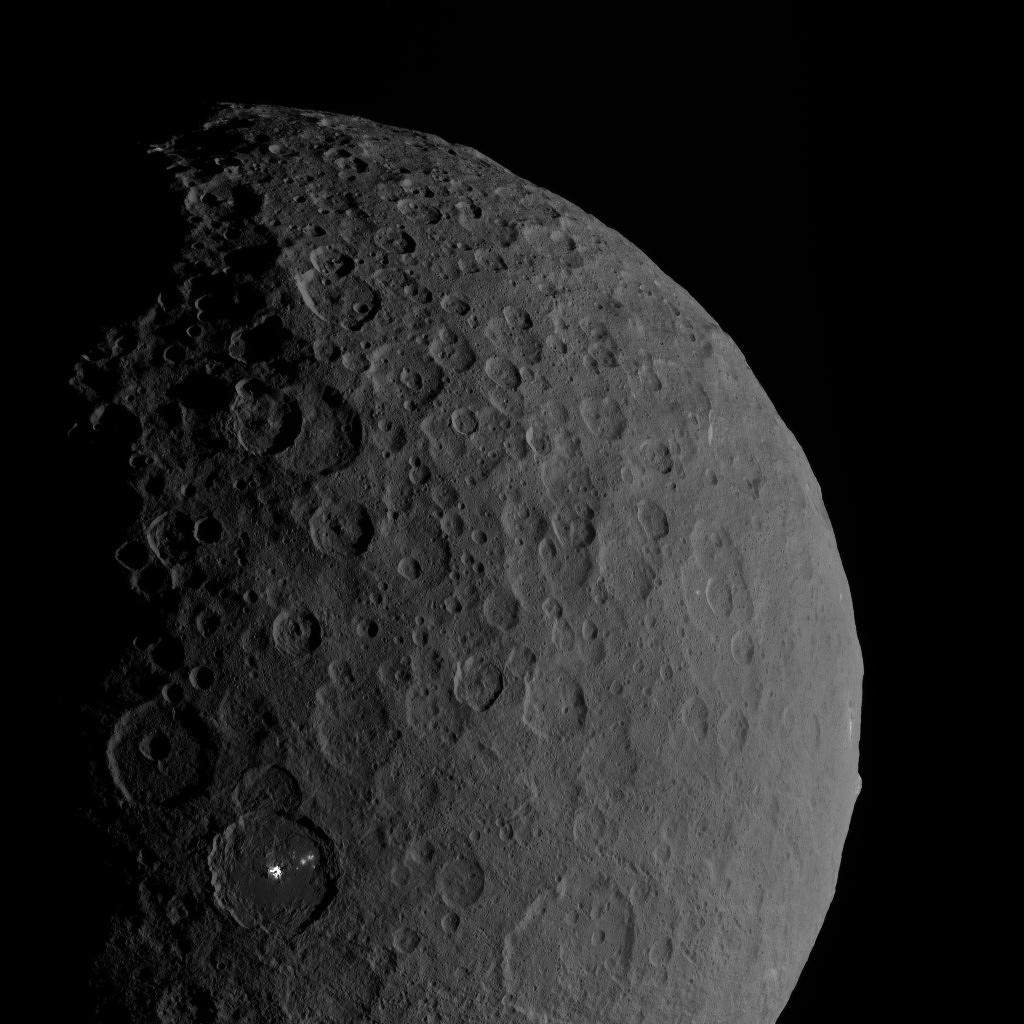
- Dawn image of Ceres taken on 11 February 2017. Liberalia Mons is on Ceres's limb on the right.
- Feature type: Mountain
- Location: Ceres
- Coordinates: 6.02°N 48.99°W
- Diameter: 90km
- Discoverer: Dawn spacecraft team 2015
- Eponym: Liberalia, festival for Ceres, Liber, and Libera in Ancient Rome.

Liberalia Mons is a mountain on the surface of the dwarf planet and large asteroid Ceres. It is located in Ceres's northern hemisphere; it is located north-west of Ahuna Mons, east of Samhain Catenae, and west of Rongo. Liberalia Mons is the largest mountain on Ceres in terms of base area. It has a diameter of roughly 90 kilometres (56 mi).

== Etymology ==
Liberalia Mons is named after the ancient Roman festival, Liberalia, celebrated on 17 March which celebrates Liber, Libera, and Ceres, the fertility gods. It was informally named such when it was discovered by the Dawn Spacecraft in March 2015 and its name was adopted by the IAU on 14 December 2015

== Geology ==
Liberalia Mons is associated with having a great amount of sodium carbonate (Na_{2}CO_{3}) because the area of an around it was upwelled from beneath the surface of Ceres. Additionally, some bright materials have been discovered from the mountain and have been unearthed due to the impact of craters.

== See also ==
- List of geological features on Ceres
- Geology of Ceres
