= Achita (crater) =

Crater on Ceres

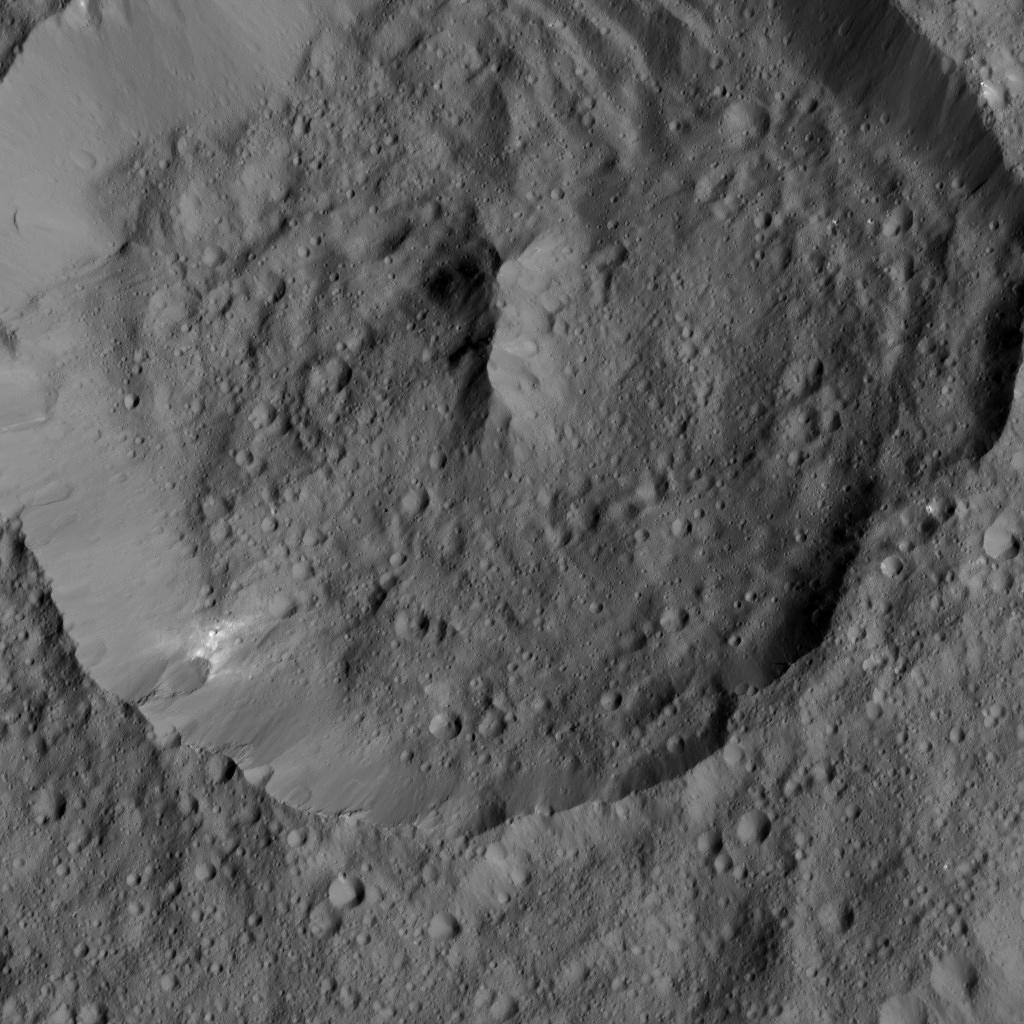
- Achita Crater
- Feature type: Impact crater
- Location: Ceres
- Coordinates: 25.82°N 65.96°E
- Diameter: 40 kilometres (25 mi)
- Discoverer: Dawn
- Naming: After the Nigerian god of agriculture

Achita is a large impact crater on the dwarf planet Ceres. The crater is named after Achita, a Nigerian god of agriculture. The crater was imaged as part of NASA's Dawn mission. The probe showed that Achita has mass-wasting ridges on the floor and is the fourth-oldest crater on Ceres having been formed 570 million years ago.
