= Ezinu (crater) =

Impact crater on Ceres

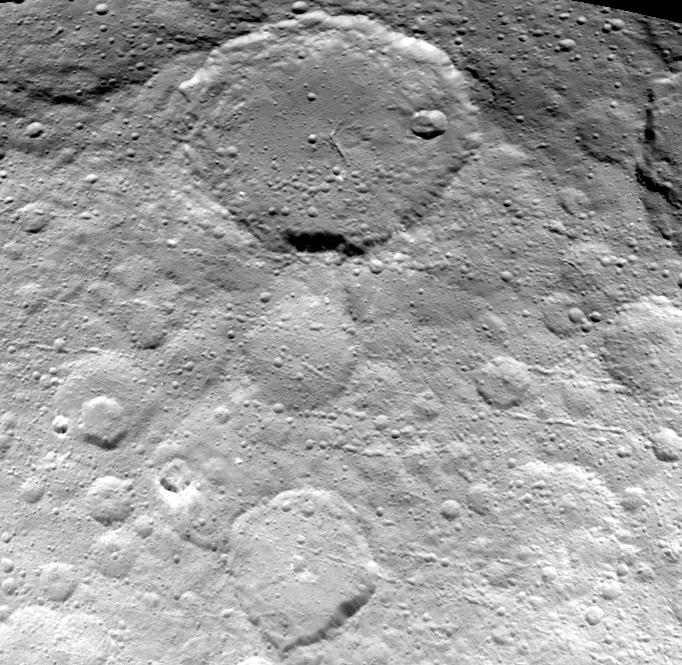
- Ezinu (top) and Nawish (bottom)
- Feature type: Impact crater
- Location: Ceres
- Coordinates: 43.2°N 195.7°E
- Diameter: 116 km
- Depth: 3.9 km (average); 5.4 km (maximum)
- Discoverer: Dawn
- Naming: Sumerian goddess of grain

Ezinu is a large impact crater on the dwarf planet Ceres, located on the edge of Hanami Planum. It was officially named on 3 July 2015 by the International Astronomical Union (IAU) after a Sumerian goddess of grain. It is the namesake of the Ezinu quadrangle, which covers a portion of Ceres's mid-latitude western hemisphere.

== Physical features ==
Ezinu is large, at roughly 116 km (72 mi) in diameter. Its depth is 3.9 km (2.4 mi) when measured from its average crater rim elevation to the deepest point on its floor. It is significantly shallower than expected; a typical cerean crater of its size would be 5 km (3.1 mi) deep. Ezinu's shallow depth is influenced by the fact that its site of impact was on the northwest flank of Hanami Planum, a large highland area. As a result, its southeast crater floor is elevated—when measured from its highest rim section, Ezinu's depth is 5.4 km (3.4 mi).

Its floor hosts a system of fractures or troughs concentrated near the center. The largest trough is curved; it is roughly 22.7 km (14.1 mi) long, 2.6 km (1.6 mi) wide, and up to 200 m (660 ft) deep. It deflects to the east, wrapping around a roughly circular mound 514 m (1,686 ft) in height. Smaller fractures radiate away from the primary trough, many of them to the east across the circular mound. Using crater counting, the age of Ezinu's floor is calculated to be either 968±76 Myr (million years) old or 257±13 Myr old. This discrepancy arises from which crater counting model is used, with the former figure derived from Lunar models and the latter figure derived from asteroid flux models.

The troughs in Ezinu's center may result from the movement of subsurface material. Early modelling indicated that an intrusion of cryomagma could reach shallow enough depths in Ceres's crust to uplift crater floors, creating fractures. Alternatively, solid-state flows of low-viscosity, low-density material akin to salt tectonics on Earth. On Ceres, the sudden removal of the upper crust during an impact event could lead to low-viscosity, low-density material flowing upwards, creating domes on the crater floor. The location of Ezinu's fracture and the circular mound indicates that it may have been the site of solid-state flow. The location of the mound on the elevated southeastern floor suggests that Ezinu's partially raised floor may be the result of a larger injection of low-viscosity, low-density material.
