= Sintana (crater) =

Crater on Ceres

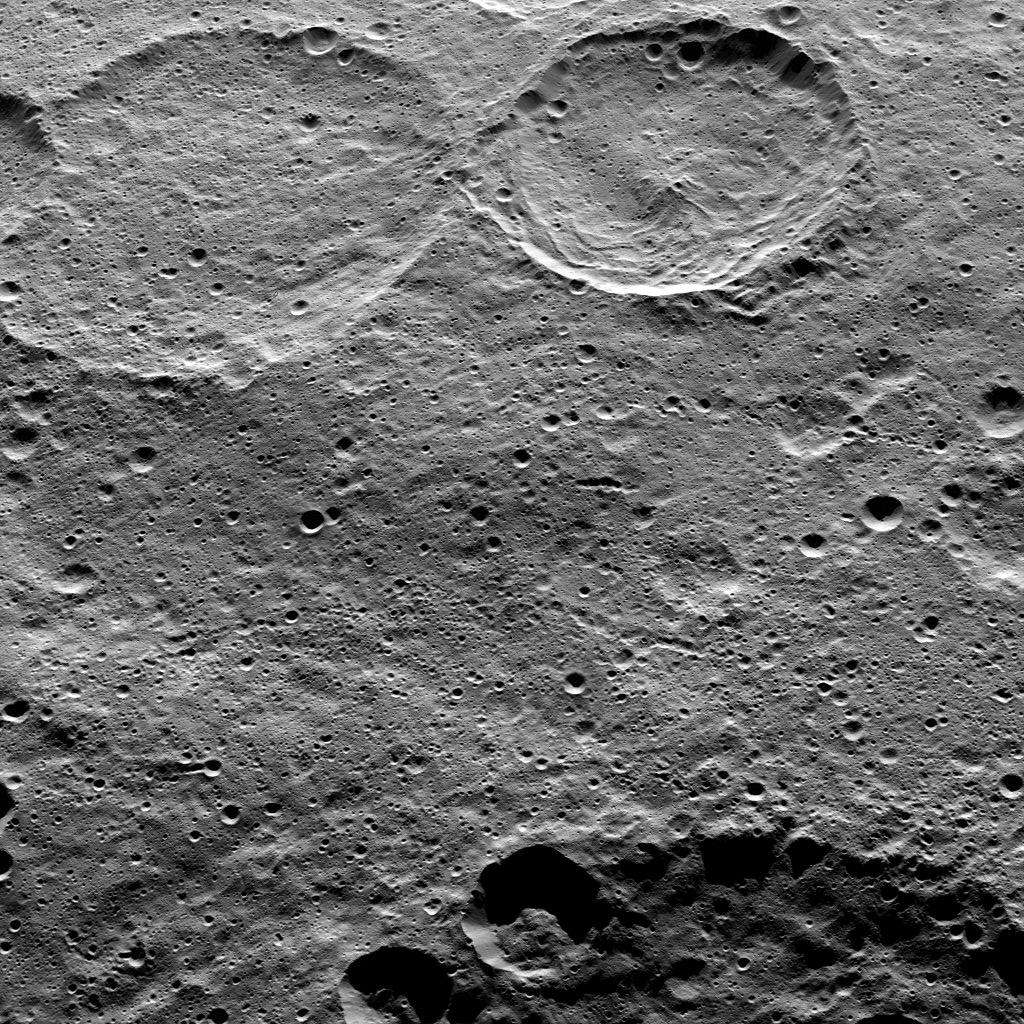
- Dawn photo showing selected crater features, Sintana crater is on top
- Feature type: Central-peak impact crater
- Location: Sintana Quadrangle, Ceres
- Coordinates: 48.07°S 46.2°E
- Diameter: 58 km
- Discoverer: Dawn
- Eponym: Kogi deity who produced fertile black earth

Sintana is a large central peak crater in the Southern Hemisphere of the dwarf planet Ceres, located at 44.21° S, 76.4 ° E. It has a diameter of 58 km, hosting a central peak. The crater is named after the deity of the Kogi people of northern Colombia who produced fertile black earth. The name Sintana was officially adopted by the International Astronomical Union (IAU) on 3 July 2015. It is the namesake of the Sintana Quadrangle.

Sintana is a relatively degraded crater. Much of the southern crater floor is covered with concentric terraces surrounding its large central peak. These terraces are the result of mass wasting processes such as landslides, likely taking place in the final stage of impact crater formation as the cavity collapses due to gravity. Sintana is surrounded by a highly degraded ejecta blanket, most of which lies to the east of the crater.

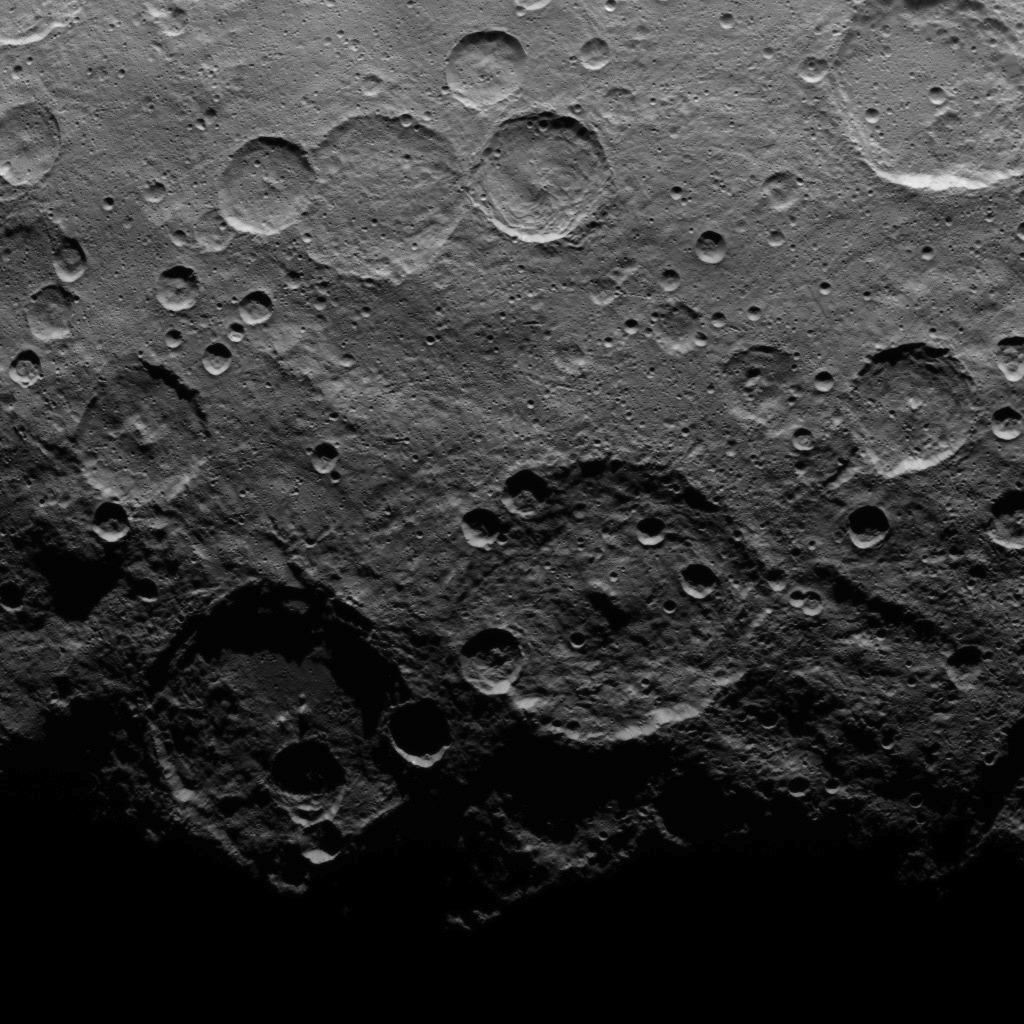
Context - Sintana crater (top)
