= Rolan Kiladze =

Georgian astronomer (1931–2010)

- Born: 24 September 1931; Tbilisi, Georgia
- Died: 22 February 2010 (aged 78); Tbilisi, Georgia
- Education: Tbilisi State University
- Scientific career
- Fields: astronomy

Rolan I. Kiladze (Georgian: როლან კილაძე; September 24, 1931 – February 22, 2010) was a Georgian astronomer, a Doctor of Physical and Mathematical Sciences (1982), and a Corresponding Member of the National Academy of Sciences of Georgia (1988).

A documentary Red Stars was made about Kiladze. The minor Planet 4737 was named “Kiladze” in his honor, and one of the dwarf planet Pluto's craters was named after him by the International Astronomical Union for his contributions to the study of Pluto's photometry, astrometry and dynamics in 2019.

== Biography ==
Abastumani Astrophysical Observatory. In 1962 he received a degree of a Doctor of Physical and Mathematical Sciences. Since 1988 he was a Corresponding Member of the Georgian Academy of Sciences. From 2001 to 2006 R. Kiladze was a director of the National Astrophysical Observatory of Georgia.

R. Kiladze also was engaged in pedagogical activity at the I. Javakhishvili Tbilisi State University (1962-2006), at the Sulkhan-Saba Orbeliani Pedagogical University (1985-1990), and from 2007 to 2010 he was a professor at the Ilya State University.

Since 1964 he was a member of the International Astronomy Society, and since 1982 - a member of the European Astronomical Council. For many years he was a Deputy Chairman of the Georgian Astronautics Committee and Vice President of the Georgian Astronomical Society.

== Scientific achievements ==
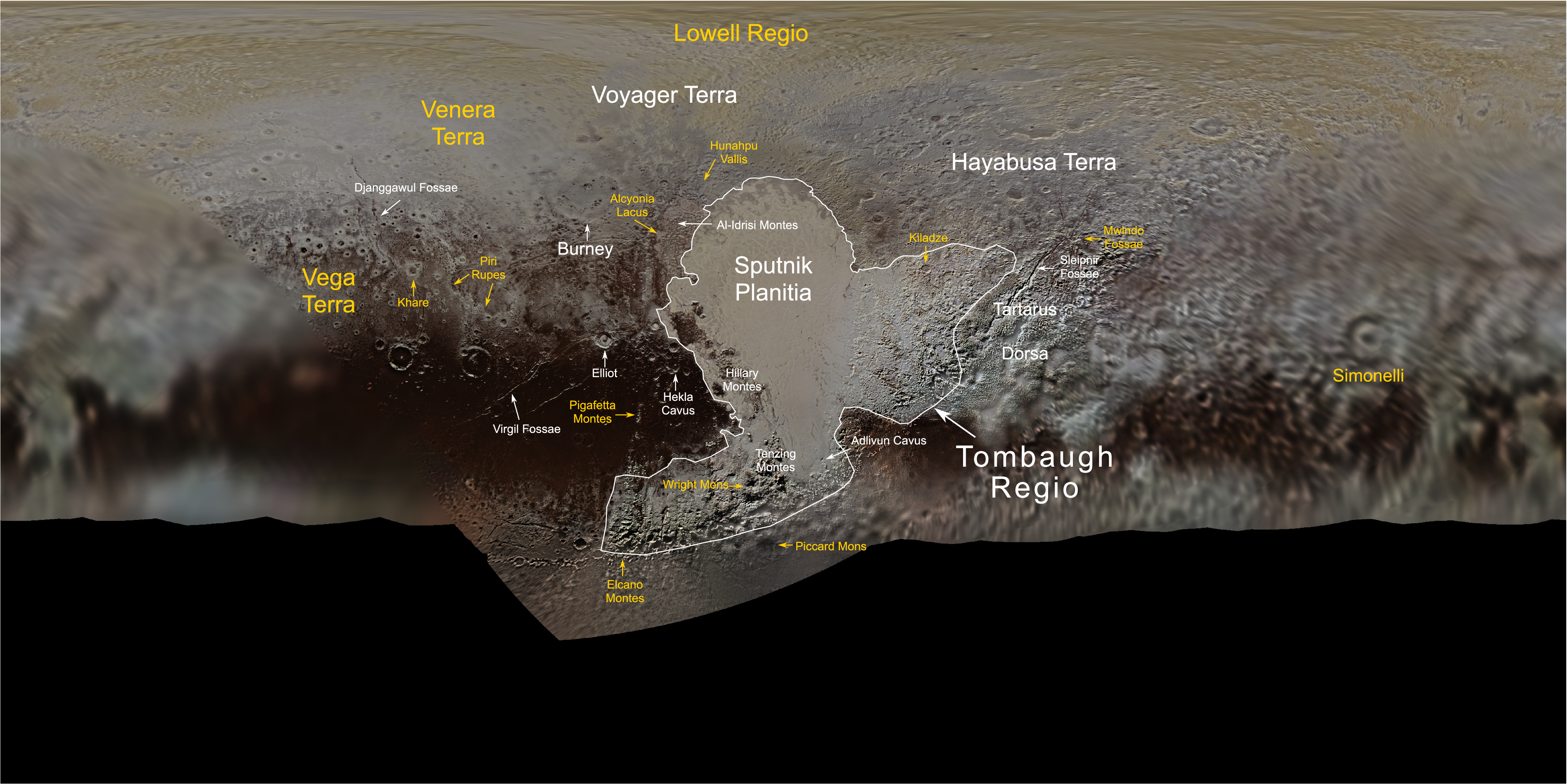
Kiladze crater on Pluto

Rolan Kiladze studied the movement and origin of the Solar System bodies. He developed a universal formula for determining the length of the day-night time for distant planets (1965).

Rolan Kiladze determined the mass of the dwarf planet Pluto (1967).

Rolan Kiladze calculated the thickness of the rings of the planet Saturn (1969), which was confirmed in 1995 by the observations of the Hubble Space Telescope.

Rolan Kiladze detected the signs of existence of the atmosphere on the planet Mercury (1974).

Rolan Kiladze discovered a supernova in the constellation Cygnus (1975).

Roland Kiladze suggested that Pluto was still undergoing the process of formation and was still surrounded by particles. He predicted the existence of the Pluto's moon Charon a year before its discovery (1977).

Rolan Kiladze developed a theory about the modern rotations of the planets which was confirmed in 2005 by the discovery of two more moons of Pluto (1986).

Rolan Kiladze with colleagues from St. Petersburg worked out the theory of movement of geosynchronous satellites (2001).

Rolan Kiladze discovered the phenomenon of regularity of the orbits of satellite debris (2004). On the basis of this discovery, the theoretical possibility of collecting of the "space debris" was created.

Rolan Kiladze found the criterion for predicting an asteroid collision with Earth based on only two positional observations (2004).

R. I. Kiladze is the author of the monograph “Modern Rotation of Planets, as a Result of Development of Small Particles” (1986), “Theory of Movement of Geostationary Satellites” (2008) and the textbook for students “Theoretical Astrophysics.” He is the author of three catalogues for geostationary satellites and more than 150 scientific articles.

== Awards ==
1970 – Medal for Labour Valour;

1971 - State Prize of The USSR;

1986 - Medal of Veteran of Labour;

1986 - Medal of “25-th universary of human’s flying into the cosmos”;

1987 - Medal of “30-th universary cosmic era”;

1987 - Medal of Acad. Koroliov;

1988 - Medal of Acad. Chelomei;

1991 – Medal of 30-th Anniversary of Gagarin's Flying in Space;

1991 - Medal of Tsiolkovsky;

1991 - Medal for achievements of the twentieth century;

2001 – Order of Honor.

== Bibliography ==
1. Kiladze, R. I., On the axial rotation of planets, Abastumanskaya Astrofiz. Obs. Byull., N 32, 231 – 234, 1965.

2. Kiladze, R. I., Physical Parameters of Pluto, Solar System Research, Vol. 1, p. 173, 1967.

3. Kiladze, Rollan, What is the Mass of Pluto? Journal of the British Astronomical Association, Vol. 78, pp. 124–125.1968.

4. Kiladze, R. I., Observations of Saturn's rings at the moments of the earth's transit through their plane 81966), Abastumanskaya Astrofiz. Obs. Byull., No. 37, p. 151 – 164, 1969.

5. Kiladze, R. I., On the atmosphere of Mercury, Astronomicheskii Tsirkulyar, No. 811, p. 7 – 8, 1974.

6. Kiladze, R. I., On determination of the brightness and coordinates of nova (or supernova) 1975, Astronomicheskii Tsirkulyar, No. 890, p. 2 – 3, 1975.

7. Kiladze, R. I., On the role of near-planetary particle swarms in the origin of spin, Abastumanskaia Astrofizicheskaia Observatoriia, Biulleten', no. 48, 1977, p. 191–212, 1977.

8. Kiladze, R. I., Present day rotation of planets as a result of development of small particle strings around them, Abastumani Astrophysical Observatory (monography), 1986.

9. Sochilina, Alla S., Grigoriev, Konstantin V., Vershkov, Andrei N., Kiladze, Rolan I., Hoots, Felix R., France, Richard, On statistics of changes in rates of drift among uncontrolled geostationary objects, In: Proceedings of the Third European Conference on Space Debris, 19–21 March 2001, Darmstadt, Germany. Ed.: Huguette Sawaya-Lacoste. ESA SP-473, Vol. 1, Noordwijk, Netherlands: ESA Publications Division, ISBN 92-9092-733-X, 2001, p. 367 – 372, 2001.

10. Vershkov, A., Grigoriev, K., Kiladze, R., Sochilina, A., A model of distribution of geostationary satellite fragments after explosion, In: Proceedings of the Third European Conference on Space Debris, 19–21 March 2001, Darmstadt, Germany. Ed.: Huguette Sawaya-Lacoste. ESA SP-473, Vol. 1, Noordwijk, Netherlands: ESA Publications Division, ISBN 92-9092-733-X, 2001, p. 407 – 410, 2001

11. Sochilina, A., Kiladze, R., Grigoriev, K., Vershkov, A., On orbital evolution of exploded object fragments, 34th COSPAR Scientific Assembly, The Second World Space Congress, held 10–19 October 2002 in Houston, TX, USA., meeting abstract, id.968, 2002.

12. Sochilina, A., Kiladze, R., Grigoriev, K., Molotov, I., Vershkov, A., On orbital evolution of exploded object fragments, 34th COSPAR Scientific Assembly, The Second World Space Congress, held 10–19 October 2002 in Houston, TX, USA., meeting abstract, id.968, 2002.

13. Sochilina, A., Kiladze, R., Grigoriev, K., Molotov, I., Vershkov, A., On the orbital evolution of explosion fragments, Advances in Space Research, Volume 34, Issue 5, p. 1198–1202, 2004.

14. Kiladze, R., Sochilina, A., Theory of Motion of Geostationary satellites (monograph), Tbilisi, 144, 2010.

15. Kiladze, R., Eexpress Method of Detecting an Asteroid Colliding with Earth, Abastumanskaya Astrofiz. Obs. Byull., N 77, 13–26, 2004.
