= Urvara (crater) =

Crater on Ceres

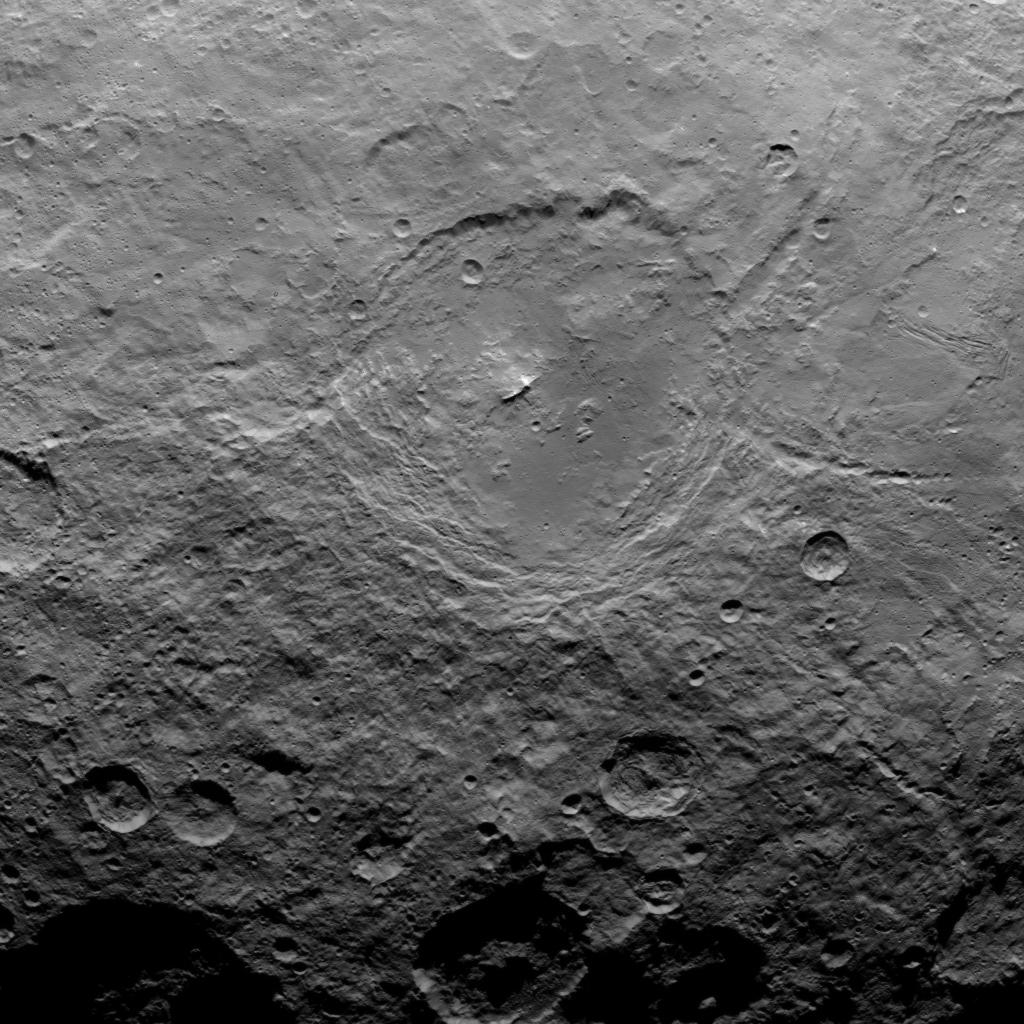
- A Dawn image of Urvara crater, slightly above center
- Feature type: Central-peak impact crater
- Location: Ceres
- Coordinates: 45.66°S 248.71°E
- Diameter: 163.23 km
- Discoverer: Dawn
- Eponym: Urvarā, Indo-Iranian personification of fertility

Urvara /ɜːrˈvɛərə/ (Sanskrit: উর্বর, romanized: urvárā) is the third-largest confirmed crater on Ceres after Kerwan and neighboring Yalode. Urvara means fertile. It is named after the ancient Indo-Iranian personification of fertility (plants in the Avesta, fertile fields in the Rig Veda). It has a central peak, and a number of unexplained ridges intersect it.

== See also ==
- List of geological features on Ceres
