= Gaussian algorithm =

Gaussian algorithm may refer to:

- Gaussian elimination for solving systems of linear equations
- Gauss's algorithm for Determination of the day of the week
- Gauss's method for preliminary orbit determination
- Gauss's Easter algorithm
- Gauss separation algorithm
