= Orbit determination =

Estimation of orbits of objects

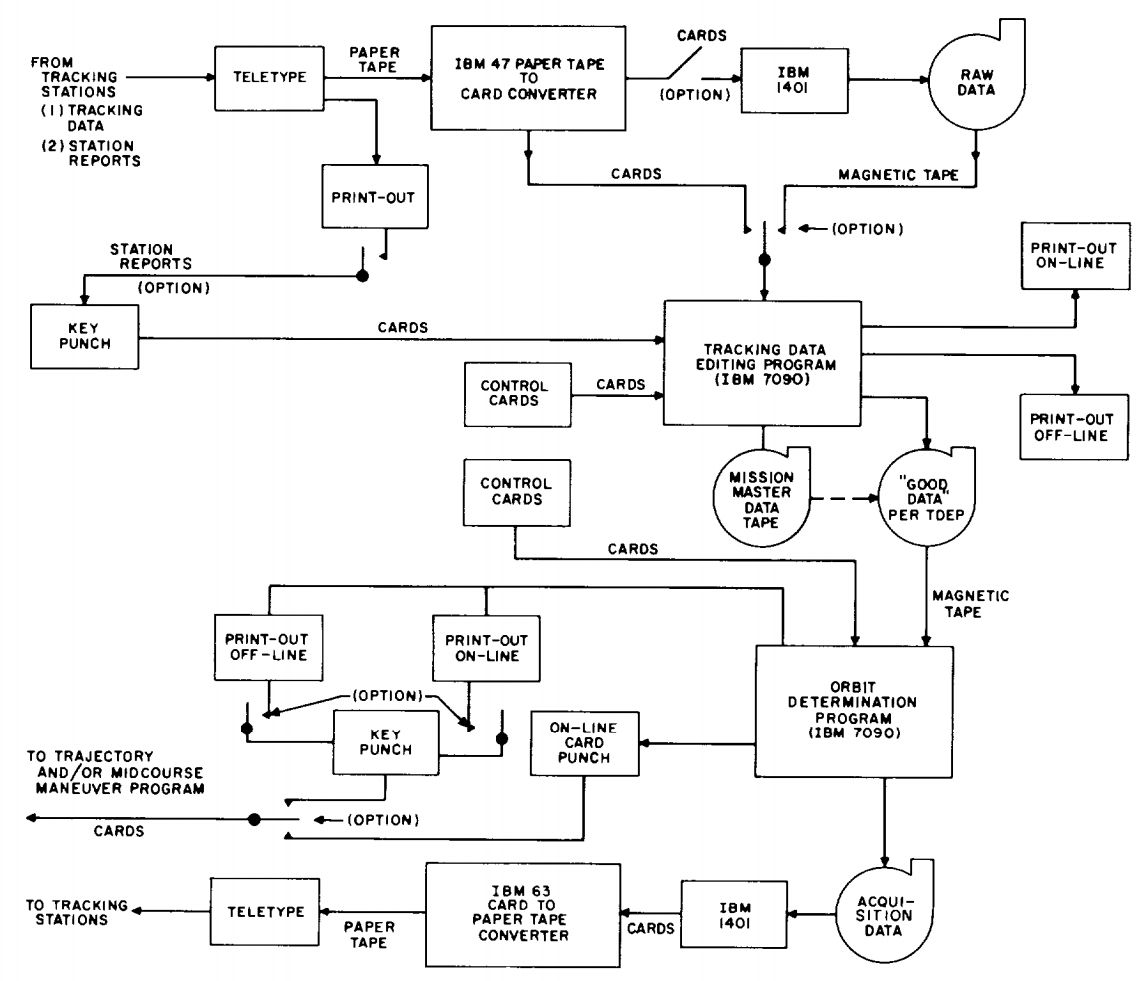
Diagram showing how orbit-determination data was handled in a 1962 NASA mission. (Of historical interest only.)

Orbit determination is the estimation of orbits of objects such as moons, planets, and spacecraft. One major application is to allow tracking newly observed asteroids and verify that they have not been previously discovered. The basic methods were discovered in the 17th century and have been continuously refined.

Observations are the raw data fed into orbit determination algorithms. Observations made by a ground-based observer typically consist of time-tagged azimuth, elevation, range, and/or range rate values. Telescopes or radar apparatus are used, because naked-eye observations are inadequate for precise orbit determination. With more or better observations, the accuracy of the orbit determination process also improves, and fewer "false alarms" result.

After orbits are determined, mathematical propagation techniques can be used to predict the future positions of orbiting objects. As time goes by, the actual path of an orbiting object tends to diverge from the predicted path (especially if the object is subject to difficult-to-predict perturbations such as atmospheric drag), and a new orbit determination using new observations serves to re-calibrate knowledge of the orbit.

Satellite tracking is another major application. For the United States and partner countries, to the extent that optical and radar resources allow, the Joint Space Operations Center gathers observations of all objects in Earth orbit. The observations are used in new orbit determination calculations that maintain the overall accuracy of the satellite catalog. Collision avoidance calculations may use this data to calculate the probability that one orbiting object will collide with another. A satellite's operator may decide to adjust the orbit, if the risk of collision in the present orbit is unacceptable. (It is not possible to adjust the orbit for events of very low probability; it would soon use up the propellant the satellite carries for orbital station-keeping.) Other countries, including Russia and China, have similar tracking assets.

== History ==
Orbit determination has a long history, beginning with the prehistoric discovery of the planets and subsequent attempts to predict their motions. Johannes Kepler used Tycho Brahe's careful observations of Mars to deduce the elliptical shape of its orbit and its orientation in space, deriving his three laws of planetary motion in the process.

The mathematical methods for orbit determination originated with the publication in 1687 of the first edition of Newton's Principia, which gave a method for finding the orbit of a body following a parabolic path from three observations. This was used by Edmund Halley to establish the orbits of various comets, including that which bears his name. Newton's method of successive approximation was formalised into an analytic method by Euler in 1744, whose work was in turn generalised to elliptical and hyperbolic orbits by Lambert in 1761–1777.

Another milestone in orbit determination was Carl Friedrich Gauss's assistance in the "recovery" of the dwarf planet Ceres in 1801. Gauss's method was able to use just three observations (in the form of celestial coordinates) to find the six orbital elements that completely describe an orbit. The theory of orbit determination has subsequently been developed to the point where today it is applied in GPS receivers as well as the tracking and cataloguing of newly observed minor planets.

== Observational data ==
In order to determine the unknown orbit of a body, some observations of its motion with time are required. In early modern astronomy, the only available observational data for celestial objects were the right ascension and declination, obtained by observing the body as it moved in its observation arc, relative to the fixed stars, using an optical telescope. This corresponds to knowing the object's relative direction in space, measured from the observer, but without knowledge of the distance of the object, i.e. the resultant measurement contains only direction information, like a unit vector.

With radar, relative distance measurements (by timing of the radar echo) and relative velocity measurements (by measuring the Doppler effect of the radar echo) are possible using radio telescopes. However, the returned signal strength from radar decreases rapidly, as the inverse fourth power of the range to the object. This generally limits radar observations to objects relatively near the Earth, such as artificial satellites and Near-Earth objects. Active radio emission by an object (such as a radio beacon or transponder) has a milder reduction in strength as the inverse square of range. Larger apertures permit tracking of transponders on interplanetary spacecraft throughout the Solar System, and radar astronomy of natural bodies.

Various space agencies and commercial providers operate tracking networks to provide these observations. See Category:Deep space networks for a partial listing. Space-based tracking of satellites is also regularly performed. See List of radio telescopes#Space-based and Space Network.

A satellite trying to determine its own orbit can use a hyperbolic navigation system for the state vectors (location and velocity) as well as time. The French DORIS system is made for this purpose and consists of many emitting ground stations. Satellite navigation systems originally used on land can also be used for this purpose, especially for LEO and SSO.

== Methods ==
Orbit determination must take into account that the apparent celestial motion of the body is influenced by the observer's own motion. For instance, an observer on Earth tracking an asteroid must take into account the motion of the Earth around the Sun, the rotation of the Earth, and the observer's local latitude and longitude, as these affect the apparent position of the body.

A key observation is that (to a close approximation) all objects move in orbits that are conic sections, with the attracting body (such as the Sun or the Earth) in the prime focus, and that the orbit lies in a fixed plane. Vectors drawn from the attracting body to the body at different points in time will all lie in the orbital plane.

If the position and velocity relative to the observer are available (as is the case with radar observations), these observational data can be adjusted by the known position and velocity of the observer relative to the attracting body at the times of observation. This yields the position and velocity with respect to the attracting body. If two such observations are available, along with the time difference between them, the orbit can be determined using Lambert's method, invented in the 18th century. See Lambert's problem for details.

Even if no distance information is available, an orbit can still be determined if three or more observations of the body's right ascension and declination have been made. Gauss's method, made famous in his 1801 "recovery" of the first lost minor planet, Ceres, has been subsequently polished.

One use is in the determination of asteroid masses via the dynamic method. In this procedure Gauss's method is used twice, both before and after a close interaction between two asteroids. After both orbits have been determined the mass of one or both of the asteroids can be worked out.

=== Orbit determination from a state vector ===
The basic orbit determination task is to determine the classical orbital elements or Keplerian elements, $a, e, i, \Omega, \omega, \nu$, from the orbital state vectors [$\vec{r}, \vec{v}$], of an orbiting body with respect to the reference frame of its central body. The central bodies are the sources of the gravitational forces, like the Sun, Earth, Moon and other planets. The orbiting bodies, on the other hand, include planets around the Sun, artificial satellites around the Earth, and spacecraft around planets. Newton's laws of motion will explain the trajectory of an orbiting body, known as Keplerian orbit.

The steps of orbit determination from one state vector are summarized as follows:

- Compute the specific angular momentum $\vec{h}$ of the orbiting body from its state vector:
  $$\vec{h} = \vec{r} \times \vec{v} = \left| \vec{h} \right| \vec{k} = h\vec{k},$$
  where $\vec{k}$ is the unit vector of the z-axis of the orbital plane. The specific angular momentum is a constant vector for an orbiting body, with its direction perpendicular to the orbital plane of the orbiting body.
- Compute the ascending node vector $\vec{n}$ from $\vec{h}$, with $\vec{K}$ representing the unit vector of the Z-axis of the reference plane, which is perpendicular to the reference plane of the central body:
  $$\vec{n} = \vec{K} \times \vec{h}.$$
  The ascending node vector is a vector pointing from the central body to the ascending node of the orbital plane of the orbiting body. Since the line of ascending node is the line of intersection between the orbital plane and the reference plane, it is perpendicular to both the normal vectors of the reference plane ($\vec{K}$) and the orbital plane ($\vec{k}$ or $\vec{h}$). Therefore, the ascending node vector can be defined by the cross product of these two vectors.
- Compute the eccentricity vector $\vec{e}$ of the orbit. The eccentricity vector has the magnitude of the eccentricity, $e$, of the orbit, and points to the direction of the periapsis of the orbit. This direction is often defined as the x-axis of the orbital plane and has a unit vector $\vec{i}$. According to the law of motion, it can be expressed as:
  $$\begin{align}
\vec{e} &= {\vec{v}\times\vec{h}\over{\mu}} - {\vec{r}\over{\left|\vec{r}\right|}} = e \vec{i}\\
&= \left ( {{\left |\vec{v} \right |}^2 \over {\mu} }- {1 \over{\left|\vec{r}\right|}} \right ) \vec{r} - {\vec{r} \cdot \vec{v} \over{\mu}} \vec{v} \\
&= \frac{1}{\mu} \left[ \left( {{\left |\vec{v} \right |}^2  }- {\mu \over{\left|\vec{r}\right|}} \right ) \vec{r} - {(\vec{r} \cdot \vec{v})} \vec{v} \right]
\end{align}$$
  $$e = \left| \vec{e} \right|$$
  where $\mu = GM$ is the standard gravitational parameter for the central body of mass $M$, and $G$ is the universal gravitational constant.
- Compute the semi-latus rectum $p$ of the orbit, and its semi-major axis $a$ (if it is not a parabolic orbit, where $e = 1$ and $a$ is undefined or defined as infinity):
  $$p = \frac{h^2}{\mu} = a (1-e^2)$$
  $$a = \frac{p}{1-e^2},$$
  (if $e \ne 1$).
- Compute the inclination $i$ of the orbital plane with respect to the reference plane:
  $$\begin{align}
\cos(i) &= \frac{\vec{K}\cdot\vec{h}}{h} = \frac{h_K}{h} \\
\Rightarrow i &= \arccos\left(\frac{\vec{K}\cdot\vec{h}}{h}\right), & i \in [0,180^\circ],
\end{align}$$
  where $h_K$ is the Z-coordinate of $\vec{h}$ when it is projected to the reference frame.
- Compute the longitude of ascending node $\Omega$, which is the angle between the ascending line and the X-axis of the reference frame:
  $$\begin{align}
\cos(\Omega) &= \frac{\vec{I}\cdot\vec{n}}{n} = \frac{n_I}{n} = \cos(360 -\Omega) \\
\Rightarrow \Omega &= \arccos\left(\frac{\vec{I}\cdot\vec{n}}{n}\right) = \Omega_0, \text{ or } \\
\Rightarrow \Omega &= 360^\circ - \Omega_0, \text{ if } n_J < 0, \\
\end{align}$$
  where $n_I$ and $n_J$ are the X- and Y- coordinates, respectively, of $\vec{n}$, in the reference frame.
  Notice that $\cos(A)=\cos(-A)=\cos(360-A)=C$, but $\arccos(C)$ is defined only in [0,180] degrees. So $\arccos(C)$ is ambiguous in that there are two angles, $A$ and $360-A$ in [0,360], who have the same $\cos$ value. It could actually return the angle $A$ or $360 - A$. Therefore, we have to make the judgment based on the sign of the Y-coordinate of the vector in the plane where the angle is measured. In this case, $n_J$ can be used for such judgment.
- Compute the argument of periapsis $\omega$, which is the angle between the periapsis and the ascending line:
  $$\begin{align}
\cos(\omega) &= \frac{\vec{n}\cdot\vec{e}}{n e} = \cos(360 -\omega) \\
\Rightarrow \omega &= \arccos\left(\frac{\vec{n}\cdot\vec{e}}{n e}\right) = \omega_0, \text{ or } \\
\Rightarrow \omega &= 360^\circ - \omega_0, \text{ if } e_K < 0, \\
\end{align}$$
  where $e_K$ is the Z-coordinate of $\vec{e}$ in the reference frame.
- Compute the true anomaly $\nu$ at epoch, which is the angle between the position vector and the periapsis at the particular time ('epoch') of observation:
  $$\begin{align}
\cos(\nu) &= \frac{\vec{e}\cdot\vec{r}}{e r} = \cos(360 -\nu) \\
\Rightarrow \nu &= \arccos\left(\frac{\vec{e}\cdot\vec{r}}{e r}\right) = \nu_0, \text{ or } \\
\Rightarrow \nu &= 360^\circ - \nu_0, \text{ if } \vec{r}\cdot\vec{v} < 0.\\
\end{align}$$
  The sign of $\vec{r}\cdot\vec{v}$ can be used to check the quadrant of $\nu$ and correct the $\arccos$ angle, because it has the same sign as the fly-path angle $\phi$. And, the sign of the fly-path angle is always positive when $\nu \in [0,180^\circ]$, and negative when $\nu \in [180^\circ,360^\circ]$. Both are related by $h = r v \sin(90-\phi)$ and $\vec{r}\cdot\vec{v} = r v \cos(90-\phi) = h \tan(\phi)$.
- Optionally, we may compute the argument of latitude $u=\omega+\nu$ at epoch, which is the angle between the position vector and the ascending line at the particular time:
  $$\begin{align}
\cos(u) &= \frac{\vec{n}\cdot\vec{r}}{n r} = \cos(360 -u) \\
\Rightarrow u &= \arccos\left(\frac{\vec{n}\cdot\vec{r}}{n r}\right) = u_0, \text{ or } \\
\Rightarrow u &= 360^\circ - u_0, \text{ if } r_K < 0, \\
\end{align}$$
  where $r_K$ is the Z-coordinate of $\vec{r}$ in the reference frame.
