= Calathus Mission =

Proposed ESA space probe for the dwarf planet Ceres

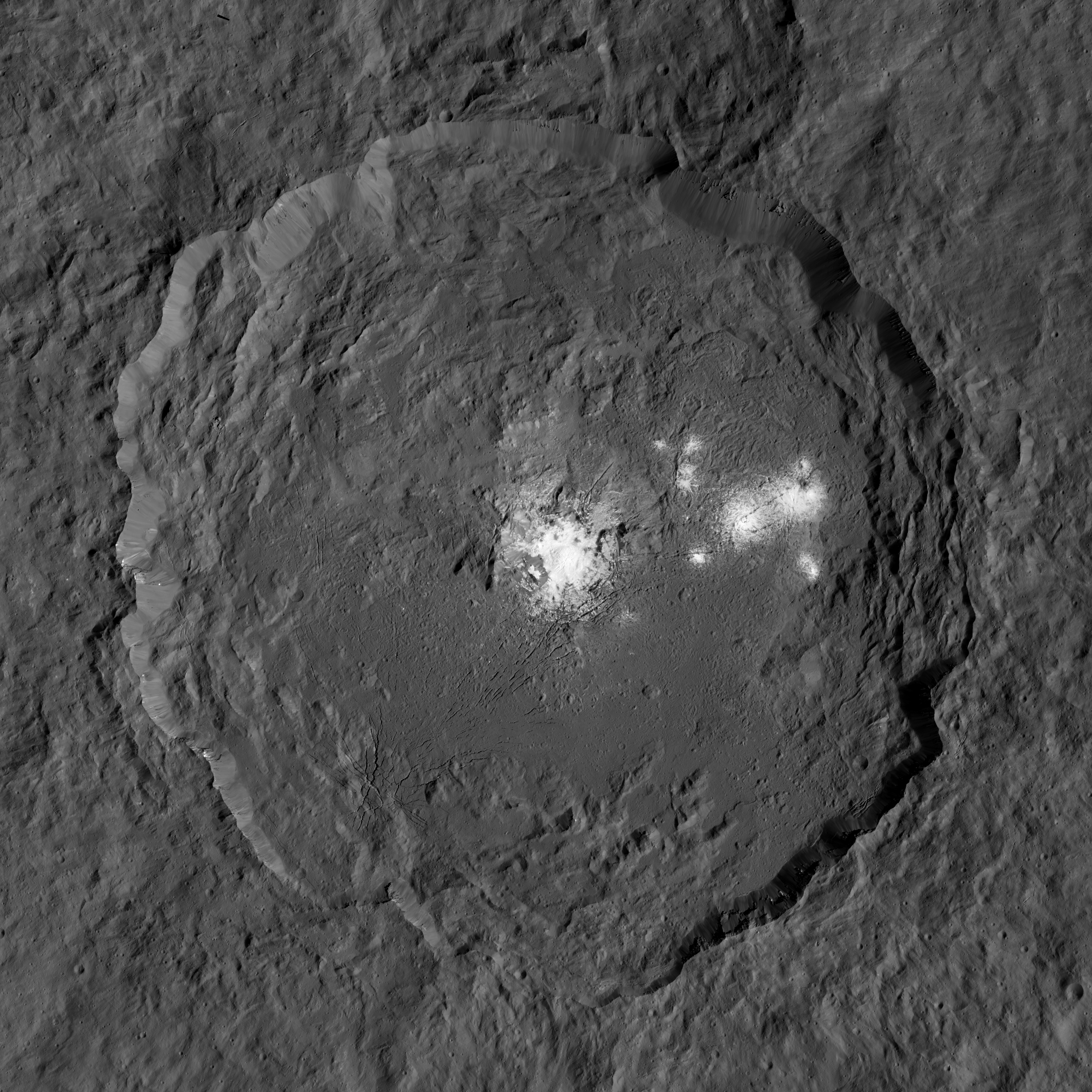
Occator Crater on Ceres

Calathus is a proposed student-designed Ceres sample-return mission, that would consist of an orbiter and a lander with an ascent module. The orbiter would be equipped with a camera, a thermal imager, and a radar; the lander would have a sampling arm, a camera, and a gas chromatograph mass spectrometer. The mission objective is to return as much as 40 grams (1.4 oz) of Ceresian soil. The mission was designed and proposed in 2018 with support of ESA.

The spacecraft would likely take samples from Occator Crater, that was studied and photographed by NASA's Dawn. There are three main scientific questions that Calathus would investigate:

- Does Ceres contain the ingredients for life?
- Where did Ceres form? Did it migrate to its current location?
- Did objects like Ceres play a significant role in delivering water and organics to the inner planets?
