= Monthly Correspondence =

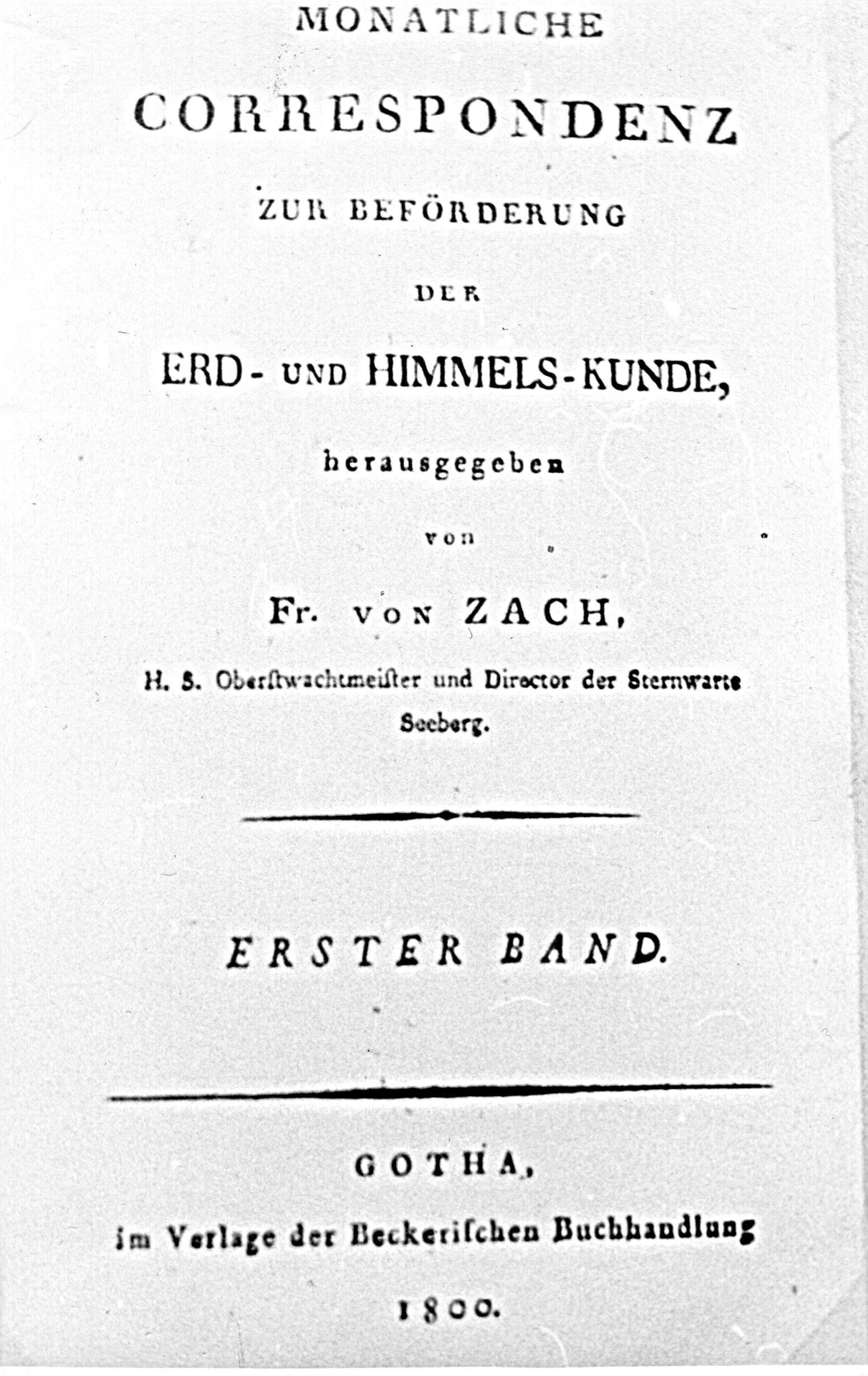
Title page of the first issue of the Monthly Correspondence for the Promotion of Geography and Astronomy (1800)

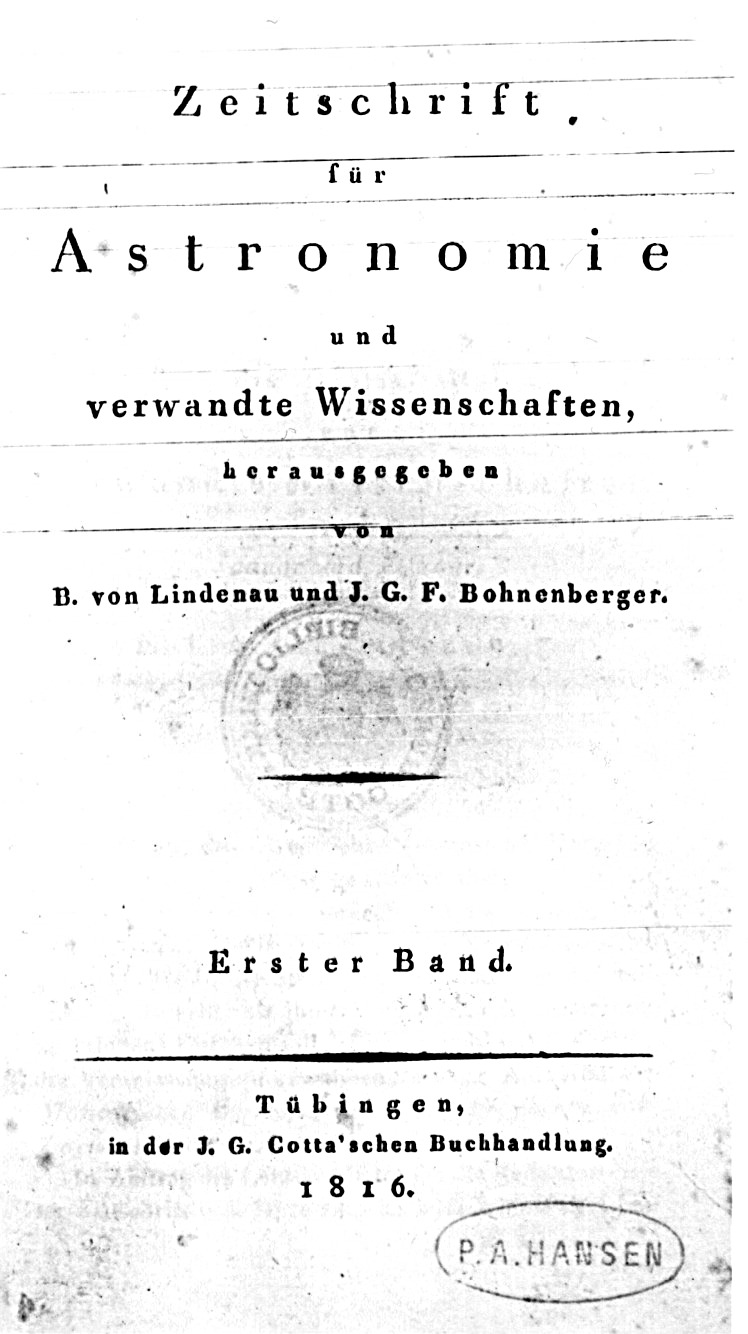
Title page of the first issue of the Journal for Astronomy and Related Sciences (1816)

Monthly Correspondence (Monatliche Correspondenz zur Beförderung der Erd- und Himmels-Kunde) was the first purely scientific journal for these sciences. It was published by Franz Xaver von Zach at the Seeberg Observatory from 1800 onwards.

Franz Xaver von Zach's lively correspondence with his European colleagues enabled him to make their findings and results available to all interested parties.

At the first European congress of astronomers in Gotha in 1798, those present confirmed the need for such a communication medium. Successes were evident in the exchange of observation techniques and analysis methods, as well as in the rediscovery of the dwarf planet Ceres in 1802.

Zach edited this new journal together with Johann Friedrich Hennicke, which was published monthly in Gotha by the Beckersche Buchhandlung publishing house, until his departure from Gotha in 1806. With a circulation of up to 300 copies, it reached all colleagues in the field, several of whom contributed more or less regularly. Thus, in addition to Zach and Lindenau, the articles also came from Bessel, Gauss, Olbers, and others. After Zach's departure from Gotha, the journal, highly regarded among astronomers, was continued by his successor, Bernhard von Lindenau, until 1813, under Zach's continued influence.

An attempt by Lindenau in 1817 to establish a successor journal under the title Zeitschrift für Astronomie had to be abandoned after two years because it did not reach the quality of the MC and was always published late due to Lindenau's professional overburdening and co-editor J. G. Bohnenberger's sluggishness.

At the suggestion of Johann Franz Encke, the extensive scientific content of the Monatliche Correspondenz was made accessible through an index published by Johann Gottfried Galle in 1850 by Becker in Gotha.

From 1818 onwards, von Zach continued publishing his journal under the title Correspondance Astronomique from Genoa, but was unable to replicate the success of the Monatliche Correspondenz.
