= Ceres (dwarf planet) =

Dwarf planet in the asteroid belt

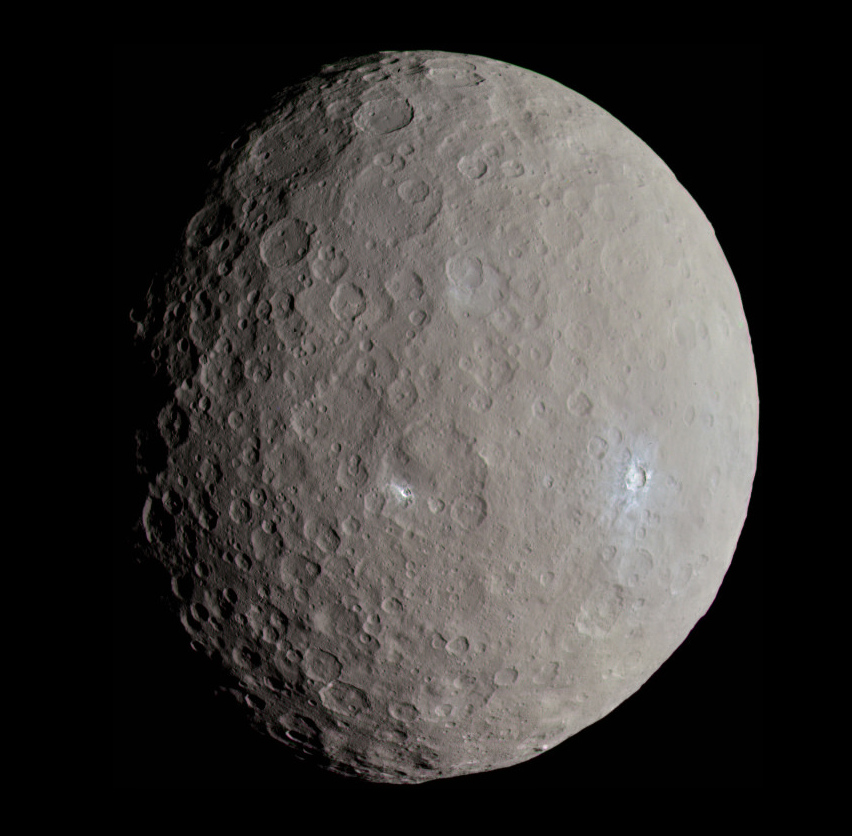
- Ceres as imaged by Dawn, May 2015. The two bright spots are the crater Haulani (right), and the floor of the crater Oxo (left).

Discovery
- Discovered by: Giuseppe Piazzi
- Discovery date: 1 January 1801

Designations
- Pronunciation: /ˈsɪəriːz/, SEER-eez
- Named after: Cerēs
- Alternative designations: (1) Ceres
- Minor planet category: dwarf planet; asteroid
- Adjectives: Cererian, -ean (/sɪˈrɪəriən/)
- Symbol: ⚳

Orbital characteristics
- Epoch 21 January 2022 (JD 2459600.5)
- Aphelion: 2.98 AU (446 million km)
- Perihelion: 2.55 AU (381 million km)
- Semi-major axis: 2.77 AU (414 million km)
- Eccentricity: 0.0785
- Orbital period (sidereal): 4.60 yr; 1680 d
- Orbital period (synodic): 1.28 yr; 466.6 d
- Average orbital speed: 17.9 km/s
- Mean anomaly: 291.4°
- Inclination: 10.6° to ecliptic; 9.20° to invariable plane
- Longitude of ascending node: 80.3°
- Time of perihelion: 11 Jul 2027
- Argument of perihelion: 73.6°
- Satellites: Dawn (derelict space probe)

Proper orbital elements
- Proper semi-major axis: 2.77 AU
- Proper eccentricity: 0.116
- Proper inclination: 9.65°
- Proper mean motion: 78.2 deg / yr
- Proper orbital period: 4.60358 yr (1681.458 d)
- Precession of perihelion long.: 54.1 arcsec / yr
- Precession of asc. node: −59.2 arcsec / yr

Physical characteristics
- Dimensions: (966.42 × 962.00 × 891.86) ± 0.015 km
- Mean diameter: 939.44±0.015 km
- Flattening: 0.074896
- Surface area: 2,772,368 km^{2} (Note: Calculated based on known parameters: Surface area: 4πr^{2}; Surface gravity: GM/r^{2}; Escape velocity: √2GM/r; Rotation velocity: circumference/(rotation period))
- Volume: (4.3413±0.0050)×10^{8} km^{3}
- Mass: (9.38392±0.00005)×10^{20} kg; 0.00016 Earths; 0.0128 Moons
- Mean density: 2.1616±0.0025 g/cm^{3}
- Equatorial surface gravity: 0.284 m/s^{2} (0.0290 g_{0})
- Moment of inertia factor: 0.36±0.15 (Note: The value given for Ceres is the mean moment of inertia, which is thought to better represent its interior structure than the polar moment of inertia, due to its high polar flattening.) (estimate)
- Equatorial escape velocity: 0.516 km/s (1155 mph)
- Sidereal rotation period: 9.074169392±0.000000019 h (Note: Calculated from its rotation rate $\frac{dW}{dt}$ = 952.1532635±0.000002 °/d.)
- Equatorial rotation velocity: 92.61 m/s
- Axial tilt: 3.997° ± 0.003°
- North pole right ascension: 291.42763° ± 0.00020°
- North pole declination: 66.76033° ± 0.00020°
- Geometric albedo: 0.090±0.0033 (V-band)
Surface temp.	min	mean	max
Kelvin	≈110	172.5±2	235±4
- Spectral type: C
- Apparent magnitude: 7.6; 9.27 (July 2021)
- Absolute magnitude (H): 3.35
- Angular diameter: 0.854″ to 0.339″

Ceres (minor-planet number 1) is a dwarf planet in the main asteroid belt between the orbits of Mars and Jupiter. It was the first object identified in the asteroid belt, discovered on 1 January 1801 by Giuseppe Piazzi at Palermo Astronomical Observatory in Sicily, and announced as a new planet. Ceres was later classified as an asteroid, and then more recently as the only confirmed dwarf planet within the asteroid belt, and the largest without a moon. It is also the only recognized dwarf planet in the solar system whose orbit lies within that of Neptune.

Ceres's diameter is about a quarter that of the Moon. Its small size means that even at its brightest it is too dim to be seen by the naked eye, except under extremely dark skies. Its apparent magnitude ranges from 6.7 to 9.3, peaking at opposition (when it is closest to Earth) once every 15- to 16-month synodic period. As a result, its surface features are barely visible even with the most powerful telescopes, and little was known about it until the robotic NASA spacecraft Dawn approached Ceres for its orbital mission in 2015.

Dawn found Ceres's surface to be a mixture of water, ice, and hydrated minerals such as carbonates and clay. Gravity data suggest Ceres to be partially differentiated into a muddy (ice–rock) mantle/core and a less dense, but stronger crust that is at most thirty percent ice by volume. Although Ceres likely has an internal ocean of liquid water, brines still flow through the outer mantle and reach the surface, allowing cryovolcanoes such as Ahuna Mons to form roughly every fifty million years. This makes Ceres the closest known cryovolcanically active body to the Sun. Ceres has an extremely tenuous and transient atmosphere of water vapour, vented from localised sources on its surface.

== History ==
In the years between the acceptance of heliocentrism in the 18th century and the discovery of Neptune in 1846, several astronomers argued that mathematical laws predicted the existence of a hidden or missing planet between the orbits of Mars and Jupiter. In 1596, theoretical astronomer Johannes Kepler believed that the ratios between planetary orbits would conform to "God's design" only with the addition of two planets: one between Jupiter and Mars and one between Venus and Mercury. Other theorists, such as Immanuel Kant, pondered whether the gap had been created by the gravity of Jupiter; in 1761, astronomer and mathematician Johann Heinrich Lambert asked: "And who knows whether already planets are missing which have departed from the vast space between Mars and Jupiter? Does it then hold of celestial bodies as well as of the Earth, that the stronger chafe the weaker, and are Jupiter and Saturn destined to plunder forever?"

In 1772, German astronomer Johann Elert Bode, citing Johann Daniel Titius, published a formula later known as the Titius–Bode law that appeared to predict the orbits of the known planets but for an unexplained gap between Mars and Jupiter. This formula predicted that there ought to be another planet with an orbital radius near 2.8 astronomical units (AU), or 420 million km, from the Sun. The Titius–Bode law gained more credence with William Herschel's 1781 discovery of Uranus near the predicted distance for a planet beyond Saturn. In 1800, a group headed by Franz Xaver von Zach, editor of the German astronomical journal Monatliche Correspondenz (Monthly Correspondence), sent requests to twenty-four experienced astronomers, whom he dubbed the "celestial police", asking that they combine their efforts and begin a methodical search for the expected planet. Although they did not discover Ceres, they later found the asteroids Pallas, Juno, and Vesta.

=== Discovery ===
One of the astronomers selected for the search was Giuseppe Piazzi, a Catholic priest at the academy of Palermo, Sicily. Before receiving his invitation to join the group, Piazzi discovered Ceres on 1 January 1801. He was searching for "the 87th [star] of the Catalogue of the Zodiacal stars of Mr la Caille", but found that "it was preceded by another". Instead of a star, Piazzi had found a moving starlike object, which he first thought was a comet. Piazzi observed Ceres twenty-four times, the final sighting occurring on 11 February 1801, when illness interrupted his work. He announced his discovery on 24 January 1801 in letters to two fellow astronomers, his compatriot Barnaba Oriani of Milan and Bode in Berlin. He reported it as a comet, but "since its movement is so slow and rather uniform, it has occurred to me several times that it might be something better than a comet". In April, Piazzi sent his complete observations to Oriani, Bode, and French astronomer Jérôme Lalande. The information was published in the September 1801 issue of the Monthly Correspondence.

By this time, the apparent position of Ceres had changed (primarily due to Earth's motion around the Sun) and was too close to the Sun's glare for other astronomers to confirm Piazzi's observations. Towards the end of the year, Ceres should have been visible again, but after such a long time, it was difficult to predict its position. To recover Ceres, the mathematician Carl Friedrich Gauss, then twenty-four years old, developed an efficient method of orbit determination. He predicted the path of Ceres within a few weeks and sent his results to von Zach. On 31 December 1801, von Zach and fellow celestial policeman Heinrich W. M. Olbers found Ceres near the predicted position and continued to record its position. At 2.8 AU from the Sun, Ceres appeared to fit the Titius–Bode law almost perfectly; when Neptune was discovered in 1846, eight AU closer than predicted, most astronomers concluded that the law was a coincidence.

The early observers were able to calculate the size of Ceres only to within an order of magnitude. Herschel underestimated its diameter at 260 km (160 mi) in 1802; in 1811, German astronomer Johann Hieronymus Schröter overestimated it at 2,613 km (1,624 mi). In the 1970s, infrared photometry enabled more accurate measurements of its albedo, and Ceres's diameter was determined to within ten percent of its true value of 939 km (583 mi).

=== Name and symbol ===
Piazzi's proposed name for his discovery was Ceres Ferdinandea: Ceres after the Roman goddess of agriculture, whose earthly home, and oldest temple, lay in Sicily; and Ferdinandea in honour of Piazzi's monarch and patron, King Ferdinand III of Sicily. The latter was not acceptable to other nations and was dropped. Before von Zach's recovery of Ceres in December 1801, von Zach referred to the planet as Hera, and Bode referred to it as Juno. Despite Piazzi's objections, those names gained currency in Germany before the object's existence was confirmed. Once it was, astronomers settled on Piazzi's name.

The adjectival forms of Ceres are Cererian and Cererean, both pronounced /sɪˈrɪəriən/. Cerium, a rare-earth element discovered in 1803, was named after Ceres. (Note: In 1807 Klaproth tried to change the name of the element to cererium, to avoid confusion with the root cēra, 'wax' (as in cereous, 'waxy'), but it did not catch on.)

The old astronomical symbol of Ceres, still used in astrology, is a sickle, ⟨⚳⟩. The sickle was one of the classical symbols of the goddess Ceres and was suggested, apparently independently, by von Zach and Bode in 1802. It is similar in form to the symbol ⟨♀⟩ (a circle with a small cross beneath) of the planet Venus, but with a break in the circle. It had various minor graphic variants, including a reversed form typeset as a 'C' (the initial letter of the name Ceres) with a plus sign. The generic asteroid symbol of a numbered disk, ①, was introduced in 1867 and quickly became the norm.

=== Classification ===
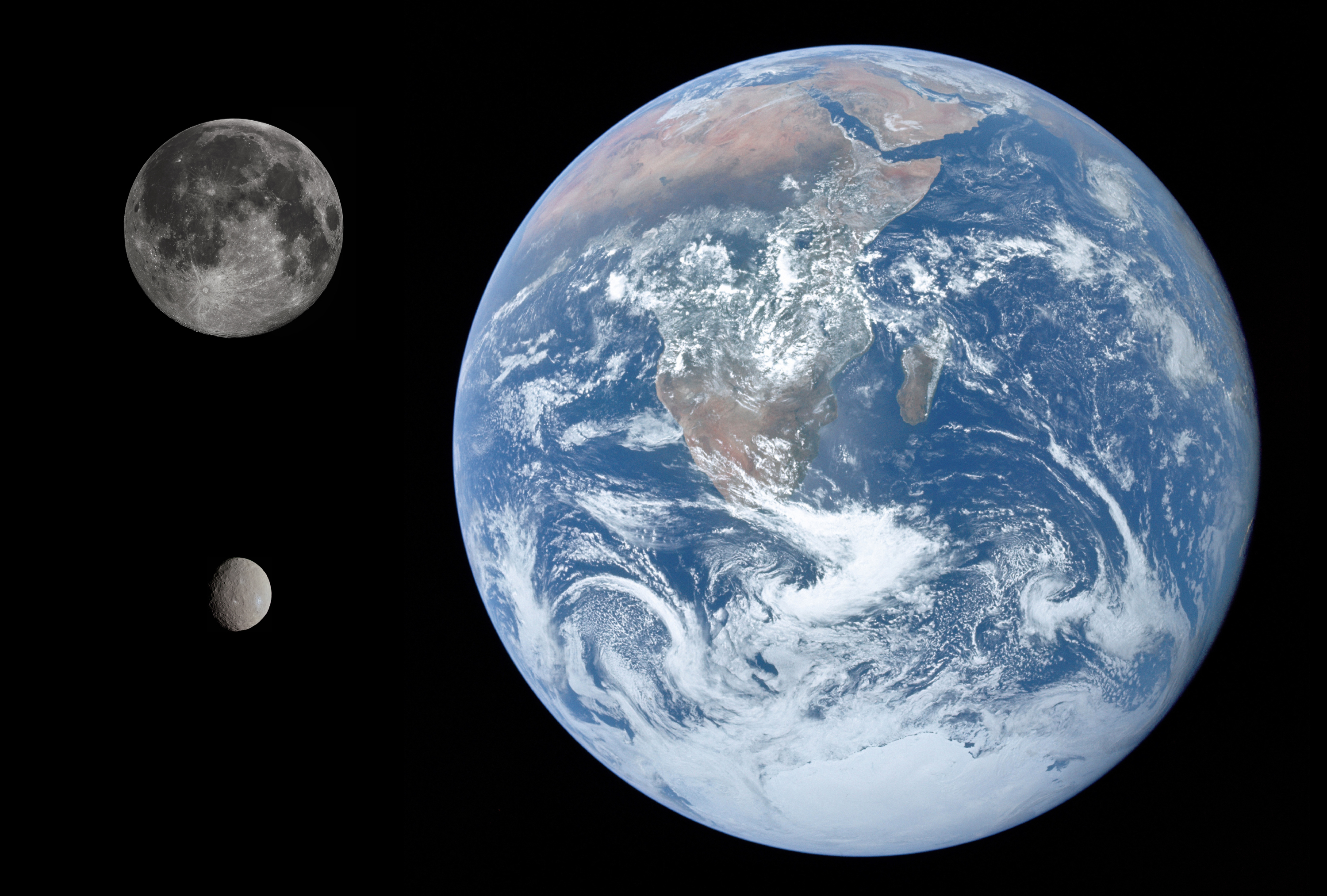
Ceres (bottom left), the Moon and Earth, shown to scale

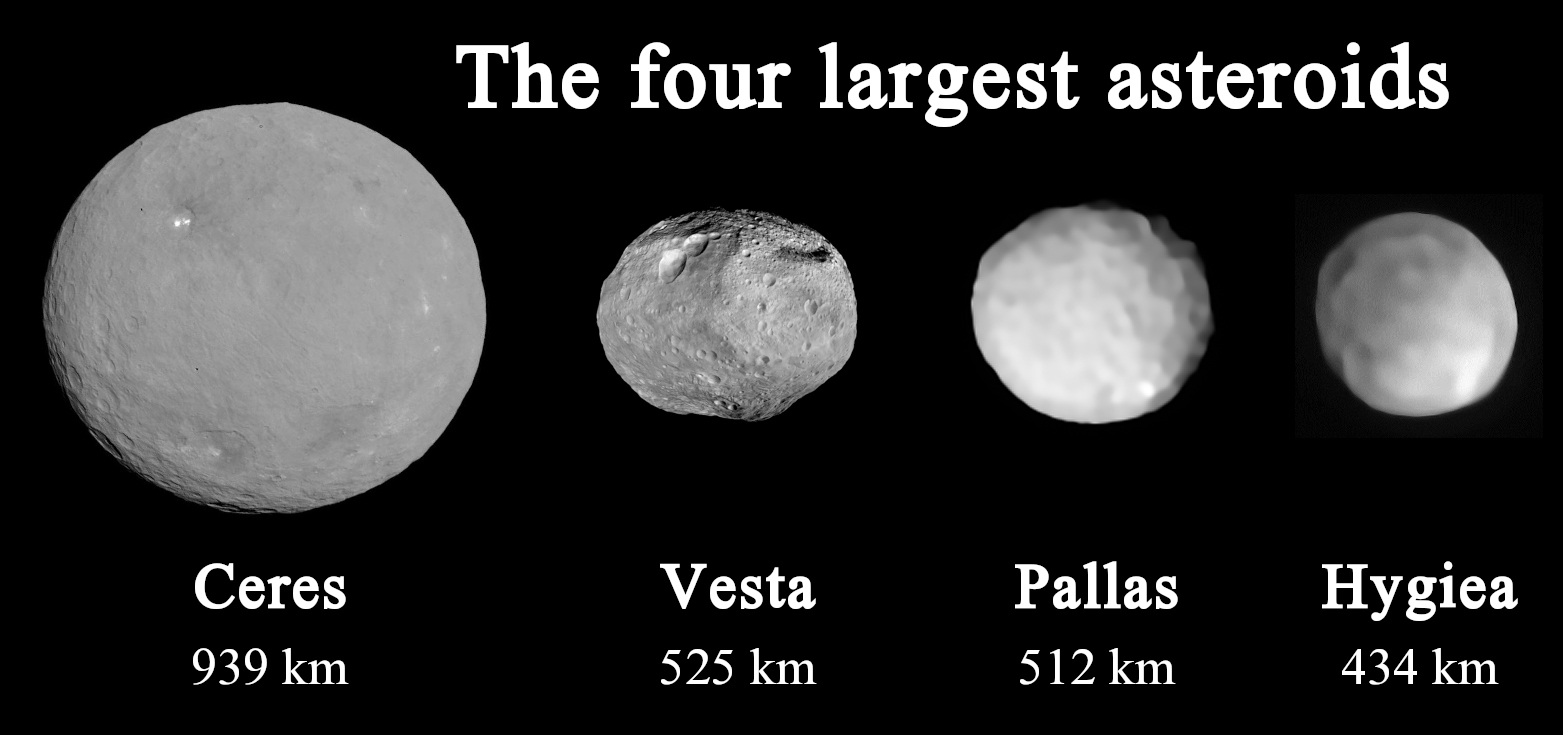
Relative mean diameters of the four largest minor planets in the asteroid belt (dwarf planet Ceres at left)

The mass of 1 Ceres (dark green) compared to other large asteroids and the remainder of the Main Belt. The unit of mass is×10^{18} kg.
1. 1 Ceres 938 (39.2%)
2. 4 Vesta 259 (10.8%)
3. 2 Pallas 204 (8.52%)
4. 10 Hygiea 87 (3.63%)
5. 704 Interamnia 35 (1.46%)
6. 15 Eunomia 30 (1.25%)
7. other ≈ 841 (35.1%)

The categorisation of Ceres has changed more than once and has been the subject of some disagreement. Bode believed Ceres to be the "missing planet" he had proposed to exist between Mars and Jupiter. Ceres was assigned a planetary symbol and remained listed as a planet in astronomy books and tables (along with Pallas, Juno, and Vesta) for over half a century.

As other objects were discovered in the neighbourhood of Ceres, astronomers began to suspect that it represented the first of a new class of objects. When Pallas was discovered in 1802, Herschel introduced the term asteroid ("star-like") for these bodies, writing that "they resemble small stars so much as hardly to be distinguished from them, even by very good telescopes". In 1852 Johann Franz Encke, in the Berliner Astronomisches Jahrbuch, declared the traditional system of granting planetary symbols too cumbersome for these new objects and introduced a new method of placing numbers before their names in order of discovery. The numbering system initially began with the fifth asteroid, 5 Astraea, as number 1, but in 1867, Ceres was adopted into the new system under the name 1 Ceres.

By the 1860s, astronomers widely accepted that a fundamental difference existed between the major planets and asteroids such as Ceres, though the word "planet" had yet to be precisely defined. In the 1950s, scientists generally stopped considering most asteroids as planets, but Ceres sometimes retained its status after that because of its planet-like geophysical complexity. Then, in 2006, the debate surrounding Pluto led to calls for a definition of "planet", and the possible reclassification of Ceres, perhaps even its general reinstatement as a planet. A proposal before the International Astronomical Union (IAU), the global body responsible for astronomical nomenclature and classification, defined a planet as "a celestial body that (a) has sufficient mass for its self-gravity to overcome rigid-body forces so that it assumes a hydrostatic equilibrium (nearly round) shape, and (b) is in orbit around a star, and is neither a star nor a satellite of a planet". Had this resolution been adopted, it would have made Ceres the fifth planet in order from the Sun, but on 24 August 2006 the assembly adopted the additional requirement that a planet must have "cleared the neighbourhood around its orbit". Ceres is not a planet because it does not dominate its orbit, sharing it as it does with the thousands of other asteroids in the asteroid belt and constituting only about forty per cent of the belt's total mass. Bodies that met the first proposed definition but not the second, such as Ceres, were instead classified as dwarf planets. Planetary geologists still often ignore this definition and consider Ceres to be a planet anyway.

Ceres is designated as a dwarf planet and an asteroid. A NASA webpage states that Vesta, the belt's second-largest object, is the largest asteroid. The IAU has been equivocal on the subject, though its Minor Planet Center, the organisation charged with cataloguing such objects, notes that dwarf planets may have dual designations, and the joint IAU / USGS / NASA Gazetteer categorises Ceres as both asteroid and a dwarf planet.

== Orbit ==
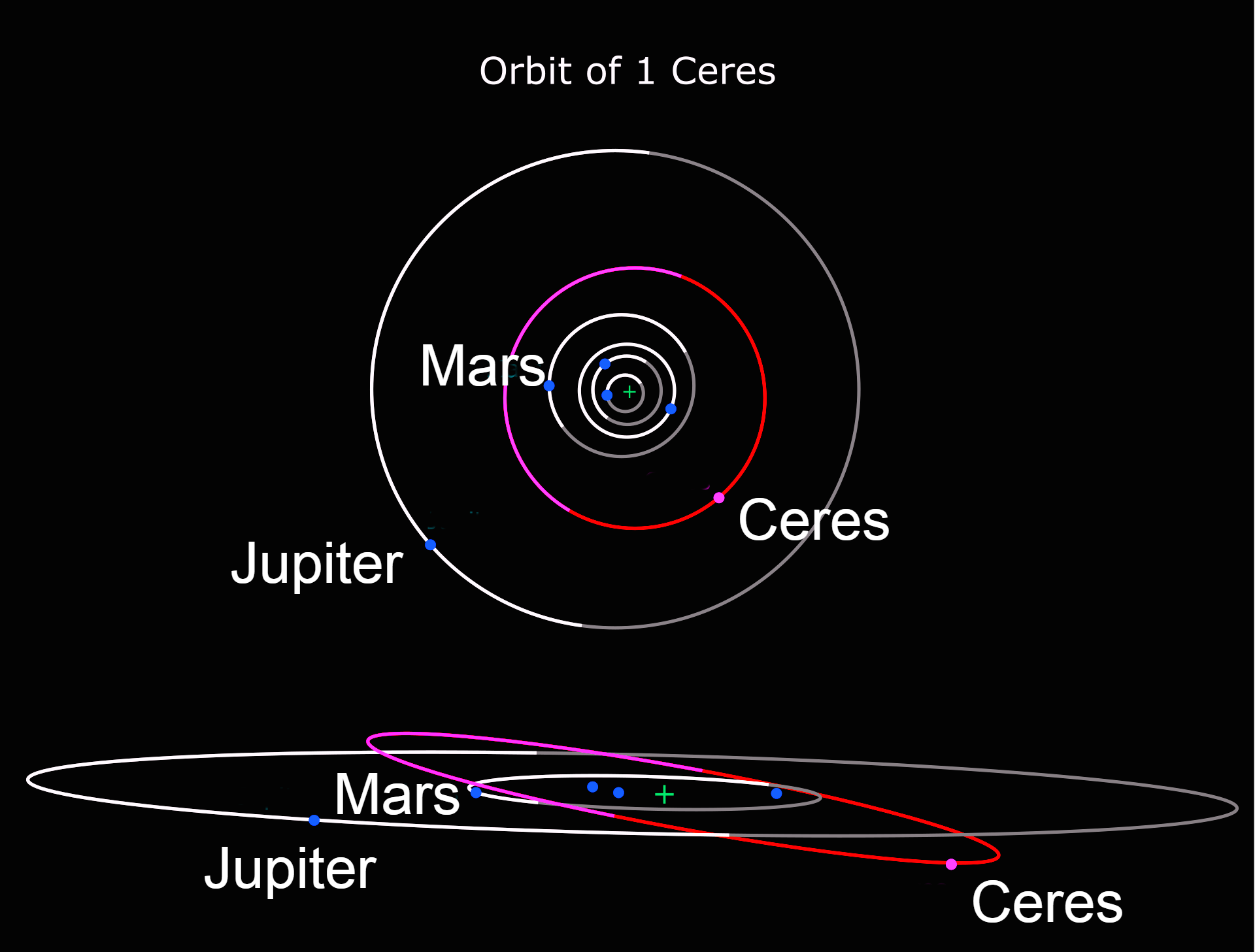
Orbits of Ceres (red, inclined) along with Jupiter and the inner planets (white and grey). The upper diagram shows Ceres's orbit from top down. The bottom diagram is a side view showing Ceres's orbital inclination to the ecliptic. Lighter shades indicate above the ecliptic; darker indicate below.

Ceres follows an orbit between Mars and Jupiter, near the middle of the asteroid belt, with an orbital period of 4.6 Earth years. Compared to other planets and dwarf planets, Ceres's orbit is moderately tilted relative to that of Earth; its inclination (i) is 10.6°, compared to 7° for Mercury and 17° for Pluto. It is also slightly elongated, with an eccentricity (e) = 0.08, compared to 0.09 for Mars. Ceres is the only widely accepted dwarf planet with an orbital period less than that of Neptune.

Ceres is not part of an asteroid family, probably due to its large proportion of ice, as smaller bodies with the same composition would have sublimated to nothing over the age of the Solar System. It was once thought to be a member of the Gefion family, the members of which share similar proper orbital elements, suggesting a common origin through an asteroid collision in the past. Ceres was later found to have a different composition from the Gefion family and appears to be an interloper, having similar orbital elements but not a common origin.

=== Resonances ===
Due to their small masses and large separations, objects within the asteroid belt rarely fall into gravitational resonances with each other. Nevertheless, Ceres is able to capture other asteroids into temporary 1:1 resonances (making them temporary trojans), for periods from a few hundred thousand to more than two million years. Fifty such objects have been identified. Ceres is close to a 1:1 mean-motion orbital resonance with Pallas (their proper orbital periods differ by 0.2%), but not close enough to be significant over astronomical timescales.

== Rotation and axial tilt ==
Permanently shadowed regions capable of accumulating surface ice

The rotation period of Ceres (the Cererian day) is 9 hours and 4 minutes; the small equatorial crater of Kait is selected as its prime meridian. Ceres has an axial tilt of 4°, small enough for its polar regions to contain permanently shadowed craters that are expected to act as cold traps and accumulate water ice over time, similar to what occurs on the Moon and Mercury. About 0.14% of water molecules released from the surface are expected to end up in the traps, hopping an average of three times before escaping or being trapped.

Dawn, the first spacecraft to orbit Ceres, determined that the north polar axis points at right ascension 19 h 25 m 40.3 s (291.418°), declination +66° 45' 50" (about 1.5 degrees from Delta Draconis), which means an axial tilt of 4°. This means that Ceres currently sees little to no seasonal variation in sunlight by latitude. Gravitational influence from Jupiter and Saturn over the course of the last three million years has triggered cyclical shifts in Ceres's axial tilt, ranging from two to twenty degrees, meaning that seasonal variation in sun exposure has occurred in the past, with the last period of seasonal activity estimated at 14,000 years ago. Those craters that remain in shadow during periods of maximum axial tilt are the most likely to retain water ice from eruptions or cometary impacts over the age of the Solar System.

== Geology ==
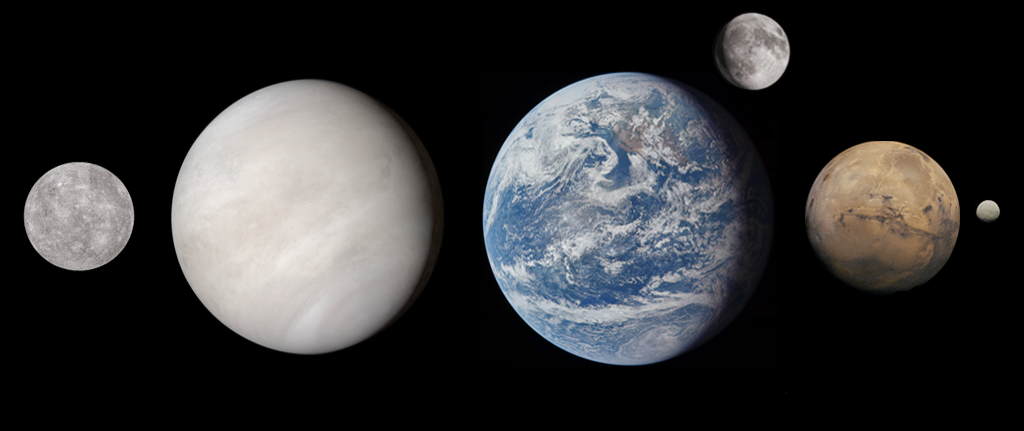
Ceres to scale among the Inner Solar System planetary-mass objects, arranged by the order of their orbits outward from the Sun (from left: Mercury, Venus, Earth, the Moon, Mars and Ceres)

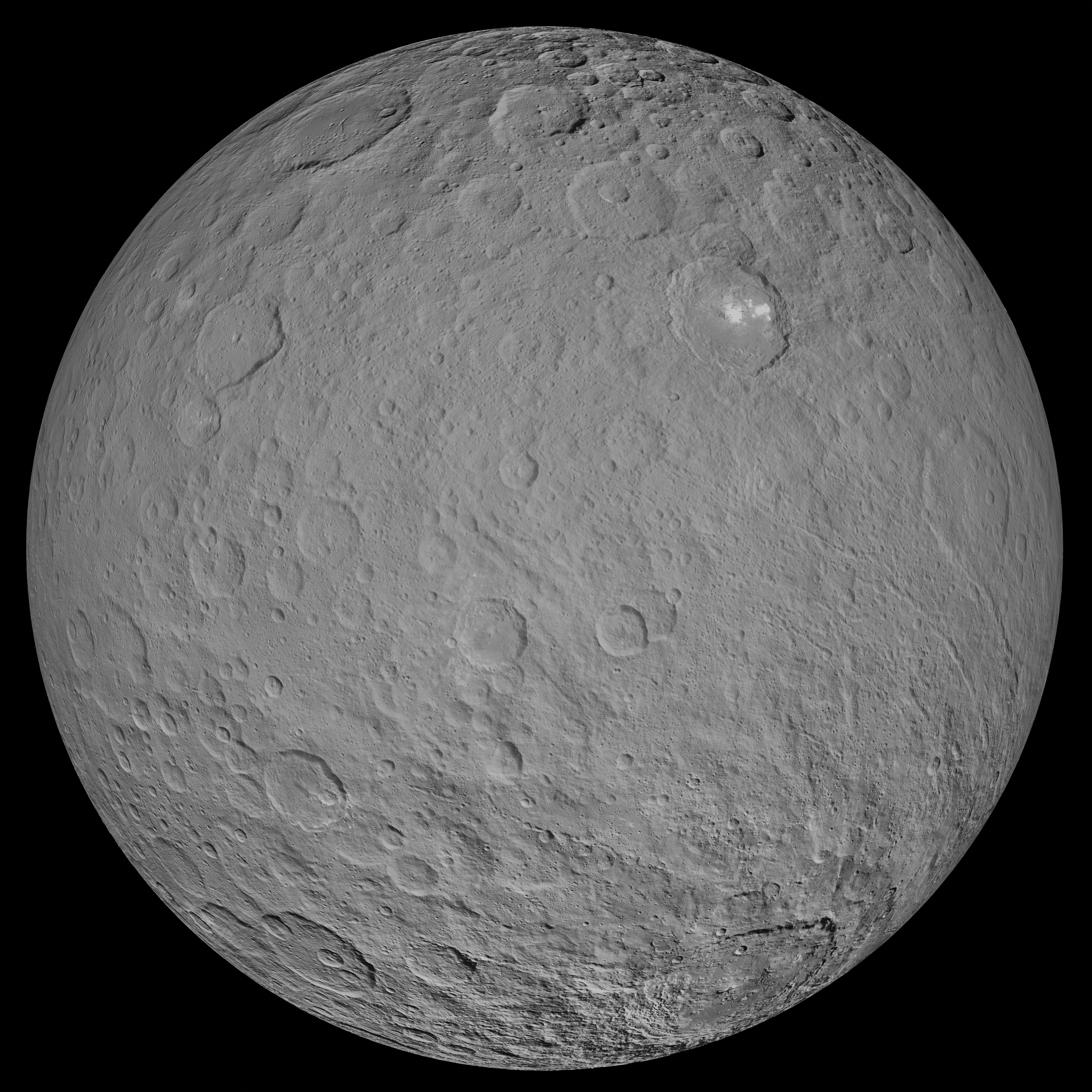
One side

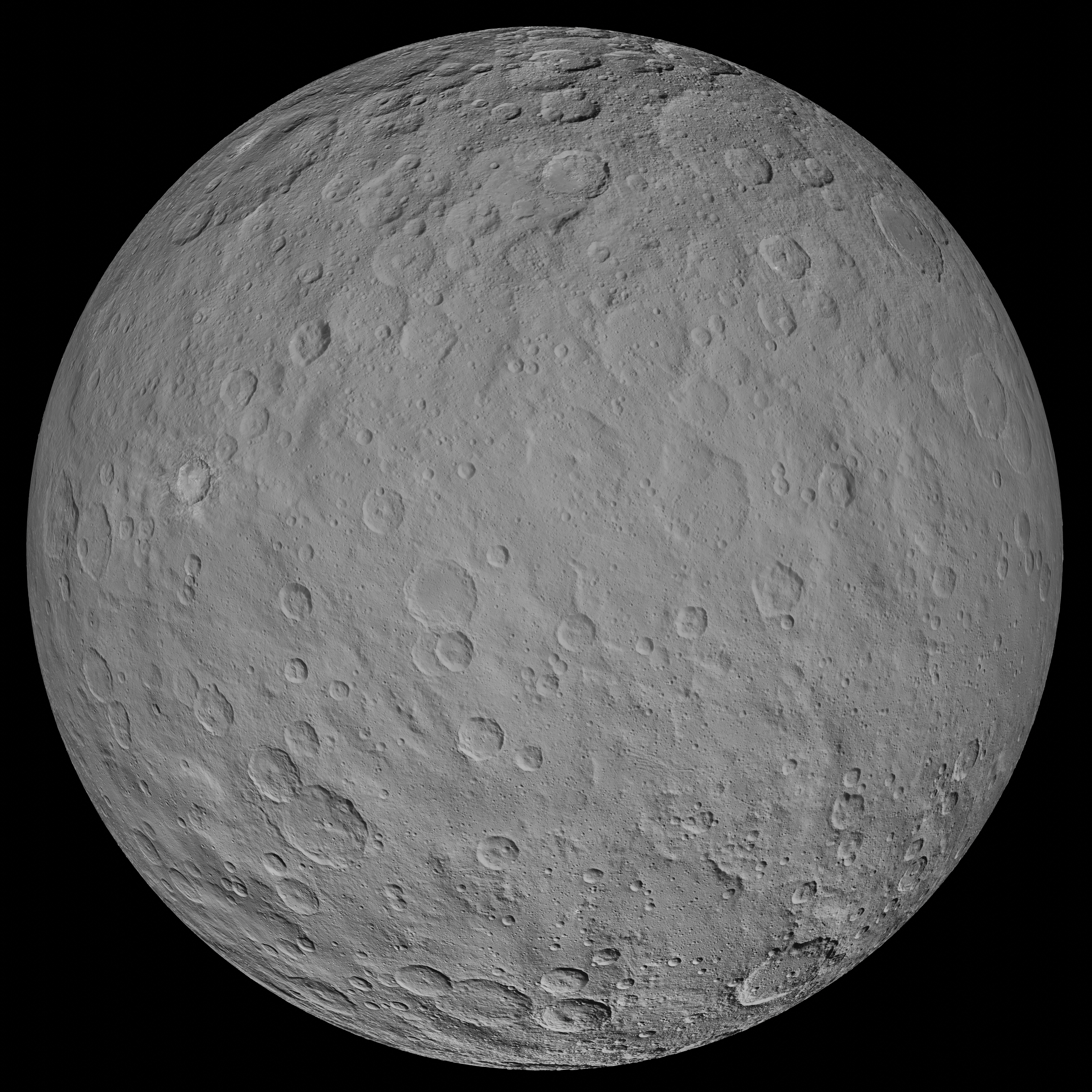
Other side

Ceres rendered with Blender. The base colour map and height map are from NASA and USGS.

Ceres is the largest asteroid in the main asteroid belt. It has been classified as a C‑type or carbonaceous asteroid and, due to the presence of clay minerals, as a G-type asteroid. It has a similar, but not identical, composition to that of carbonaceous chondrite meteorites. It is an oblate spheroid, with an equatorial diameter 8% larger than its polar diameter. Measurements from the Dawn spacecraft found a mean diameter of 939.4 km (583.7 mi) and a mass of 9.38×10^{20} kg. This gives Ceres a density of 2.16 g/cm^{3}, suggesting that a quarter of its mass is water ice.

Ceres makes up 40% of the estimated (2394±5)×10^{18} kg mass of the asteroid belt, and it has 3 1/2 times the mass of the next asteroid, Vesta, but it has only 1/78 the mass of the Moon, and its surface gravity is 1/35 that of Earth (1/6 of the Moon's). It is close to being in hydrostatic equilibrium, but some deviations from an equilibrium shape have yet to be explained. Modelling has suggested Ceres's rocky material is partially differentiated, and that it may possess a small core, but the data is also consistent with a mantle of hydrated silicates and no core. Because Dawn lacked a magnetometer, it is not known if Ceres has a magnetic field; it is believed not to. Ceres's internal differentiation may be related to its lack of a natural satellite, as satellites of main belt asteroids are mostly believed to form from collisional disruption, creating an undifferentiated, rubble pile structure.

=== Surface ===
==== Composition ====
The surface composition of Ceres is homogeneous on a global scale, and it is rich in carbonates and ammoniated phyllosilicates that have been altered by water, though water ice in the regolith varies from approximately 10% in polar latitudes to much drier, even ice-free, in the equatorial regions.

Studies using the Hubble Space Telescope show graphite, sulfur, and sulfur dioxide on Ceres's surface. The graphite is evidently the result of space weathering on Ceres's older surfaces; the latter two are volatile under Cererian conditions and would be expected to either escape quickly or settle in cold traps, and so are evidently associated with relatively recent geological activity.

Organic compounds were detected in the Ernutet crater, and at least another eleven regions are candidates for their presence. Most of the planet's near surface is rich in carbon, at approximately 20% by mass. The carbon content is more than five times higher than in carbonaceous chondrite meteorites analysed on Earth. The surface carbon shows evidence of being mixed with products of rock-water interactions, such as clays. This chemistry suggests Ceres formed in a cold environment, perhaps outside the orbit of Jupiter, and that it accreted from ultra-carbon-rich materials in the presence of water, which could provide conditions favourable to organic chemistry.

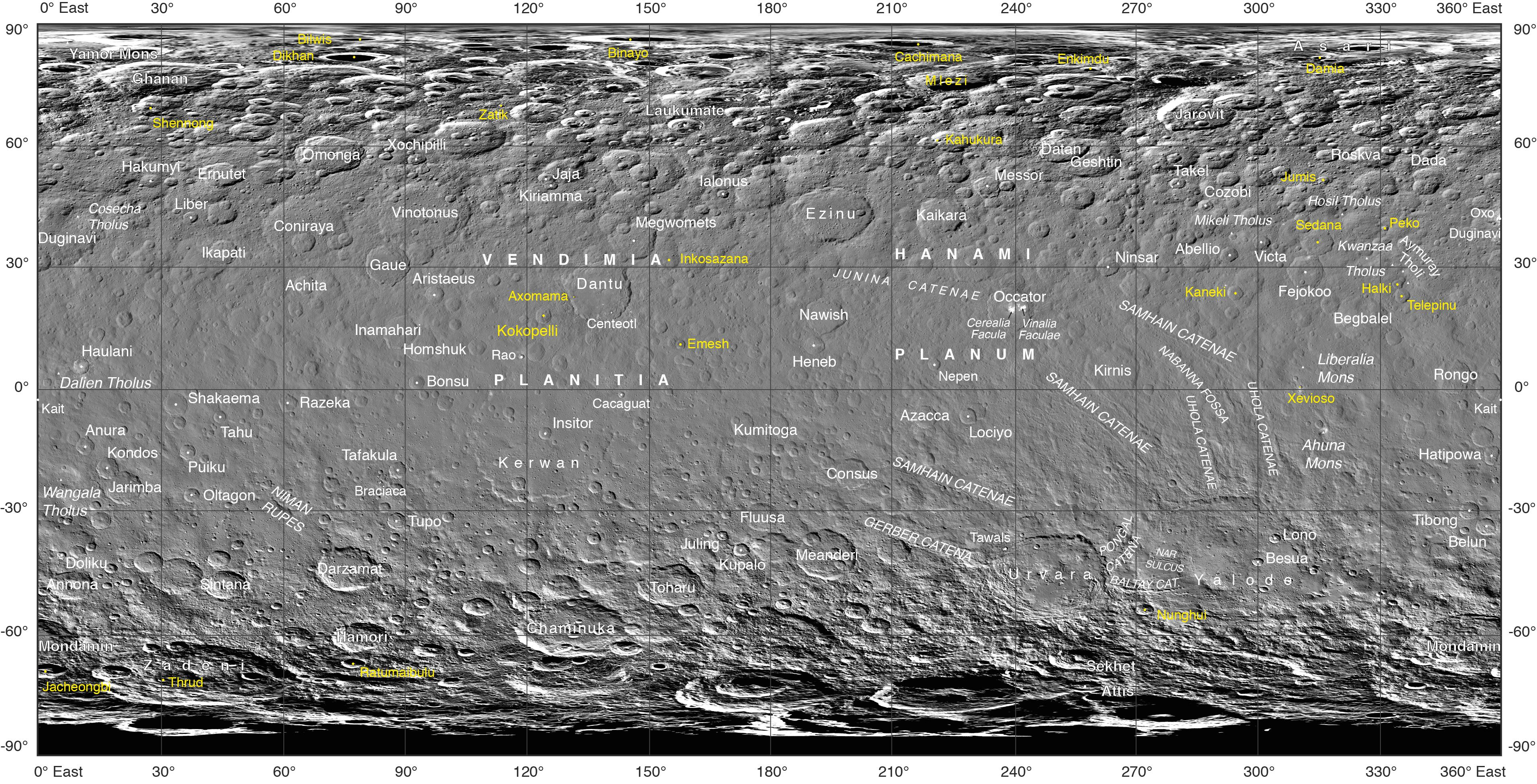
Black-and-white photographic map of Ceres, centred on 180° longitude, with official nomenclature (September 2017)

Ceres, polar regions (November 2015): North (left); south (right). The south pole is in shadow. "Ysolo Mons" has since been renamed "Yamor Mons."

==== Craters ====
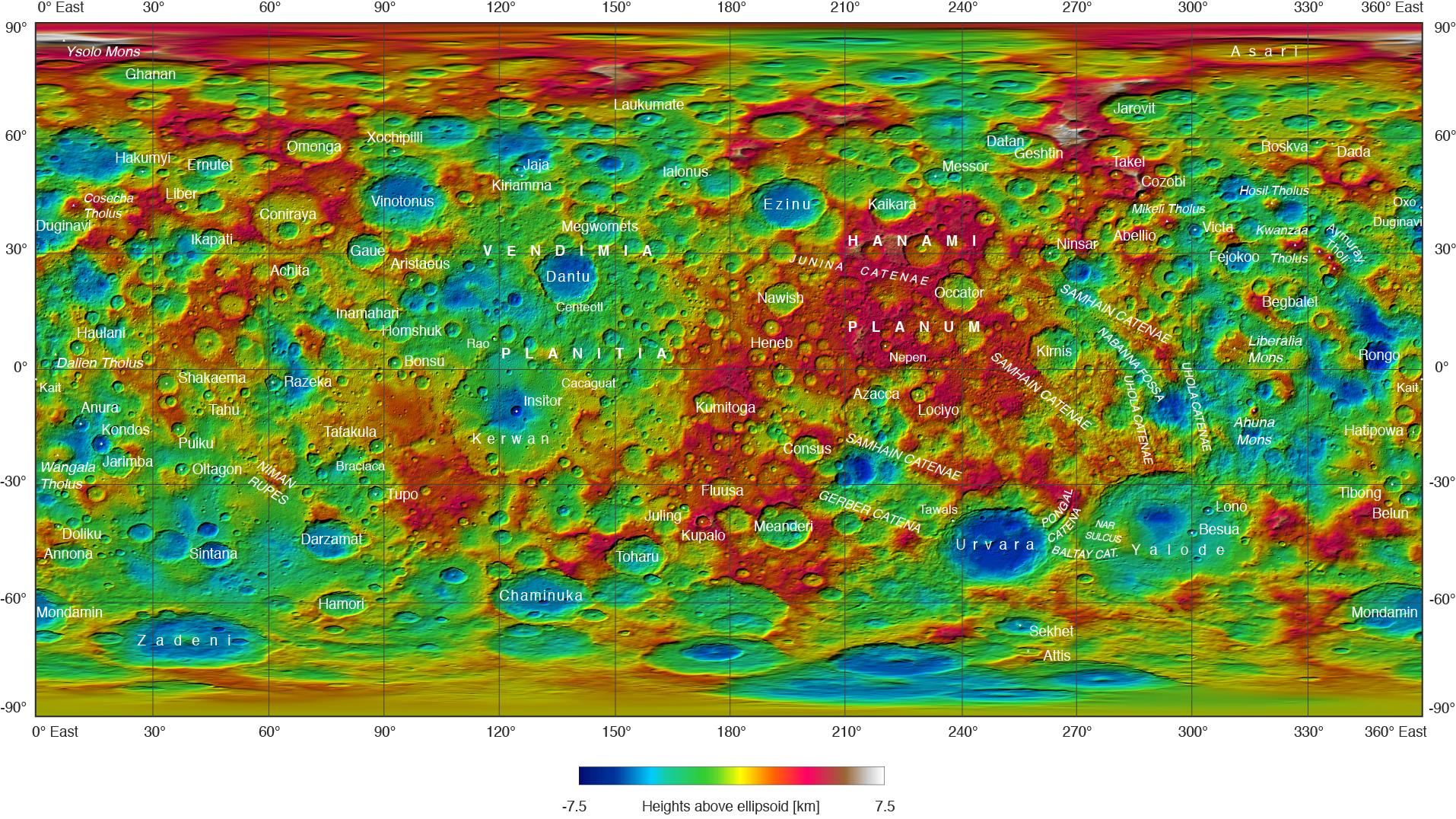
Topographic map of Ceres. The lowest crater floors (indigo) and the highest peaks (white) represent a difference of 15 km (10 mi) elevation. "Ysolo Mons" has been renamed "Yamor Mons."

Dawn revealed that Ceres has a heavily cratered surface, though with fewer large craters than expected. Models based on the formation of the current asteroid belt had predicted Ceres should have ten to fifteen craters larger than 400 km (250 mi) in diameter. The largest confirmed crater on Ceres, Kerwan Basin, is 284 km (176 mi) across. The most likely reason for this is viscous relaxation of the crust slowly flattening out larger impacts.

Ceres's north polar region shows far more cratering than the equatorial region, with the eastern equatorial region in particular comparatively lightly cratered. The overall size frequency of craters of between twenty and a hundred kilometres (10–60 mi) is consistent with their having originated in the Late Heavy Bombardment, with craters outside the ancient polar regions likely erased by early cryovolcanism. Three large shallow basins (planitiae) with degraded rims are likely to be eroded craters. The largest, Vendimia Planitia, at 800 km (500 mi) across, is also the largest single geographical feature on Ceres. Two of the three have higher than average ammonium concentrations.

Dawn observed 4,423 boulders larger than 105 m (344 ft) in diameter on the surface of Ceres. These boulders likely formed through impacts, and are found within or near craters, though not all craters contain boulders. Large boulders are more numerous at higher latitudes. Boulders on Ceres are brittle and degrade rapidly due to thermal stress (at dawn and dusk, the surface temperature changes rapidly) and meteoritic impacts. Their maximum age is estimated to be 150 million years, much shorter than the lifetime of boulders on Vesta.

==== Tectonic features ====
Although Ceres lacks plate tectonics, with the vast majority of its surface features linked either to impacts or to cryovolcanic activity, several potentially tectonic features have been tentatively identified on its surface, particularly in its eastern hemisphere. The Samhain Catenae, kilometre-scale linear fractures on Ceres's surface, lack any apparent link to impacts and bear a stronger resemblance to pit crater chains, which are indicative of buried normal faults. Also, several craters on Ceres have shallow, fractured floors consistent with cryomagmatic intrusion.

==== Cryovolcanism ====
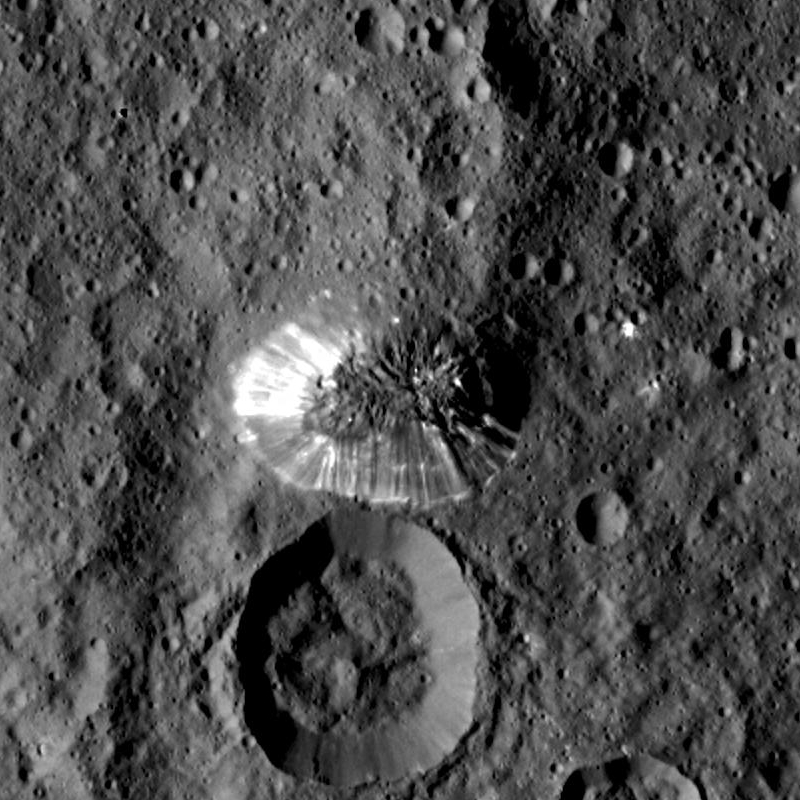
Ahuna Mons (center) is an estimated 5 km (3 mi) high on its steepest side.

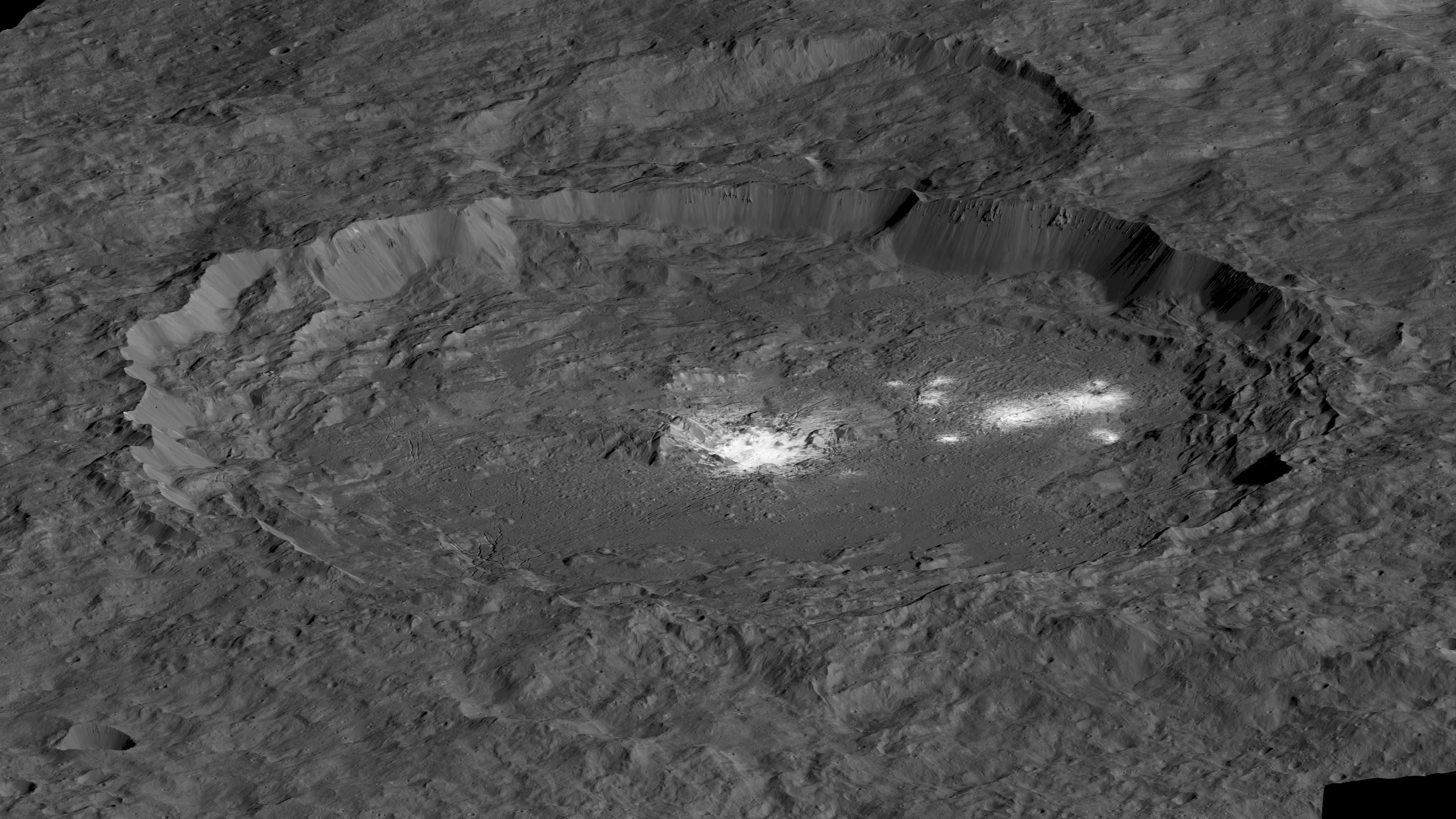
Simulated view of Cerealia and Vinalia Faculae

Ceres has one prominent mountain, Ahuna Mons; this appears to be a cryovolcano and has few craters, suggesting a maximum age of 240 million years. Its relatively high gravitational field suggests it is dense, and thus composed more of rock than ice, and that its placement is likely due to diapirism of a slurry of brine and silicate particles from the top of the mantle. It is roughly antipodal to Kerwan Basin. Seismic energy from the Kerwan-forming impact may have focused on the opposite side of Ceres, fracturing the outer layers of the crust and triggering the movement of high-viscosity cryomagma (muddy water ice softened by its content of salts) onto the surface. Kerwan too shows evidence of the effects of liquid water due to impact-melting of subsurface ice.

A 2018 computer simulation suggests that cryovolcanoes on Ceres, once formed, recede due to viscous relaxation over several hundred million years. The team identified 22 features as strong candidates for relaxed cryovolcanoes on Ceres's surface. Yamor Mons, an ancient, impact-cratered peak, resembles Ahuna Mons despite being much older, due to it lying in Ceres's northern polar region, where lower temperatures prevent viscous relaxation of the crust. Models suggest that, over the past billion years, one cryovolcano has formed on Ceres on average every fifty million years. The eruptions may be linked to ancient impact basins but are not uniformly distributed over Ceres. The model suggests that, contrary to findings at Ahuna Mons, Cererian cryovolcanoes must be composed of far less dense material than average for Ceres's crust, or the observed viscous relaxation could not occur.

An unexpectedly large number of Cererian craters have central pits, perhaps due to cryovolcanic processes; others have central peaks. Hundreds of bright spots (faculae) have been observed by Dawn, the brightest in the middle of 80 km (50 mi) Occator Crater. The bright spot in the centre of Occator is named Cerealia Facula, and the group of bright spots to its east, Vinalia Faculae. Occator possesses a pit 9–10 km wide, partially filled by a central dome. The dome post-dates the faculae and is likely due to freezing of a subterranean reservoir, comparable to pingos in Earth's Arctic region. A haze periodically appears above Cerealia, supporting the hypothesis that some sort of outgassing or sublimating ice formed the bright spots. In March 2016 Dawn found definitive evidence of water ice on the surface of Ceres at Oxo crater.

On 9 December 2015, NASA scientists reported that the bright spots on Ceres may be due to a type of salt from evaporated brine containing magnesium sulfate hexahydrate (MgSO_{4}·6H_{2}O); the spots were also found to be associated with ammonia-rich clays. Near-infrared spectra of these bright areas were reported in 2017 to be consistent with a large amount of sodium carbonate (Na_{2}CO_{3}) and smaller amounts of ammonium chloride (NH_{4}Cl) or ammonium bicarbonate (NH_{4}HCO_{3}). These materials have been suggested to originate from the crystallisation of brines that reached the surface. In August 2020 NASA confirmed that Ceres was a water-rich body with a deep reservoir of brine that percolated to the surface in hundreds of locations causing "bright spots", including those in Occator Crater.

=== Internal structure ===
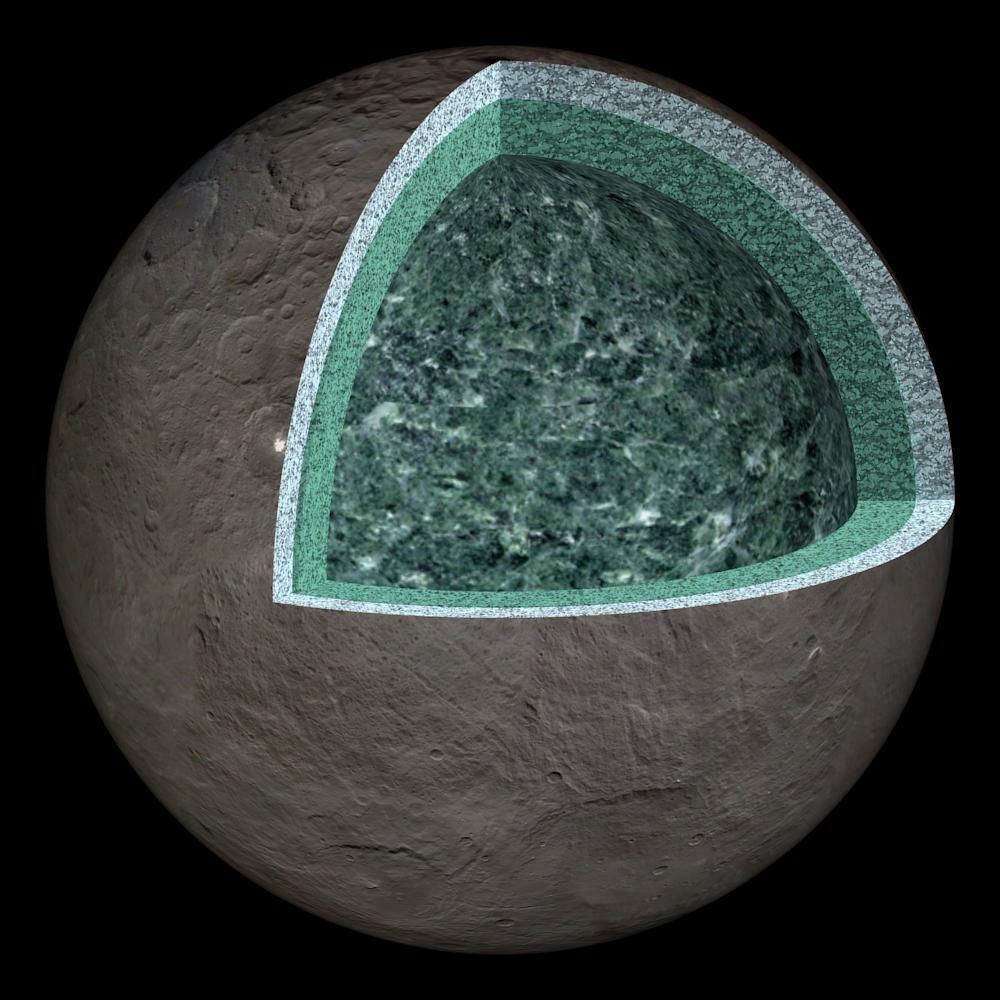
Three-layer model of Ceres's internal structure: Thick outer crust (ice, salts, hydrated minerals); Salt-rich liquid (brine) and rock; "Mantle" (hydrated rock)

The active geology of Ceres is driven by ice and brines. Water leached from rock is estimated to possess a salinity of around 5%. Altogether, Ceres is approximately 50% water by volume (compared to 0.1% for Earth) and 73% rock by mass.

Ceres's largest craters are several kilometres deep, inconsistent with an ice-rich shallow subsurface. The fact that the surface has preserved craters almost 300 km (200 mi) in diameter indicates that the outermost layer of Ceres is roughly 1000 times stronger than water ice. This is consistent with a mixture of silicates, hydrated salts and methane clathrates, with no more than 30% water ice by volume.

Gravity measurements from Dawn have generated three competing models for Ceres's interior. In the three-layer model, Ceres is thought to consist of an outer, 40 km (25 mi) thick crust of ice, salts and hydrated minerals and an inner muddy "mantle" of hydrated rock, such as clays, separated by a 60 km (37 mi) layer of a muddy mixture of brine and rock. It is not possible to tell if Ceres's deep interior contains liquid or a core of dense material rich in metal, but the low central density suggests it may retain about 10% porosity. One study estimated the densities of the core and mantle/crust to be 2.46–2.90 and 1.68–1.95 g/cm^{3} respectively, with the mantle and crust together being 70–190 km (40–120 mi) thick. Only partial dehydration (expulsion of ice) from the core is expected, though the high density of the mantle relative to water ice reflects its enrichment in silicates and salts. That is, the core (if it exists), the mantle and crust all consist of rock and ice, though in different ratios.

Ceres's mineral composition can be determined (indirectly) only for its outer 100 km (60 mi). The solid outer crust, 40 km (25 mi) thick, is a mixture of ice, salts, and hydrated minerals. Under that is a layer that may contain a small amount of brine. This extends to a depth of at least the 100 km (60 mi) limit of detection. Under that is thought to be a mantle dominated by hydrated rocks such as clays.

In one two-layer model, Ceres consists of a core of chondrules and a mantle of mixed ice and micron-sized solid particulates ("mud"). Sublimation of ice at the surface would leave a deposit of hydrated particulates perhaps twenty metres thick. The range of the extent of differentiation is consistent with the data, from a large, 360 km (220 mi) core of 75% chondrules and 25% particulates and a mantle of 75% ice and 25% particulates, to a small, 85 km (55 mi) core consisting nearly entirely of particulates and a mantle of 30% ice and 70% particulates. With a large core, the core–mantle boundary should be warm enough for pockets of brine. With a small core, the mantle should remain liquid below 110 km (68 mi). In the latter case a 2% freezing of the liquid reservoir would compress the liquid enough to force some to the surface, producing cryovolcanism.

A second two-layer model suggests a partial differentiation of Ceres into a volatile-rich crust and a denser mantle of hydrated silicates. A range of densities for the crust and mantle can be calculated from the types of meteorite thought to have impacted Ceres. With CI-class meteorites (density 2.46 g/cm^{3}), the crust would be approximately 70 km (40 mi) thick and have a density of 1.68 g/cm^{3}; with CM-class meteorites (density 2.9 g/cm^{3}), the crust would be approximately 190 km (120 mi) thick and have a density of 1.9 g/cm^{3}. Best-fit modelling yields a crust approximately 40 km (25 mi) thick with a density of approximately 1.25 g/cm^{3}, and a mantle/core density of approximately 2.4 g/cm^{3}.

== Quasi-moon ==
(76146) 2000 EU16 is a small asteroid in the main-belt discovered on 3 March 2000, and the only known quasi-satellite of Ceres.

== Exosphere ==
In 2017, Dawn confirmed that Ceres has a transient atmosphere of water vapour. Hints of an atmosphere had appeared in early 2014, when the Herschel Space Observatory detected localised mid-latitude sources of water vapour on Ceres, no more than 60 km (40 mi) in diameter, which each give off approximately 10^{26} molecules (3 kg) of water per second. (Note: This emission rate is modest compared to those calculated for the tidally driven plumes of Enceladus (a smaller body) and Europa (a larger body), 200 kg/s and 7000 kg/s, respectively.) Two potential source regions, designated Piazzi (123°E, 21°N) and Region A (231°E, 23°N), were visualised in the near infrared as dark areas (Region A also has a bright centre) by the W. M. Keck Observatory. Possible mechanisms for the vapour release are sublimation from approximately 0.6 km^{2} (0.2 sq mi) of exposed surface ice, cryovolcanic eruptions resulting from radiogenic internal heat, or pressurisation of a subsurface ocean due to thickening of an overlying layer of ice. In 2015, David C. Jewitt included Ceres in his list of active asteroids. Surface water ice is unstable at distances less than 5 AU from the Sun, so it is expected to sublime if exposed directly to solar radiation. Proton emission from solar flares and CMEs can sputter exposed ice patches on the surface, leading to a positive correlation between detections of water vapour and solar activity. Water ice can migrate from the deep layers of Ceres to the surface, but it escapes in a short time. Surface sublimation would be expected to be lower when Ceres is farther from the Sun in its orbit, and internally powered emissions should not be affected by its orbital position. The limited data previously available suggested cometary-style sublimation, but evidence from Dawn suggests geologic activity could be at least partially responsible.

Studies using Dawn's gamma ray and neutron detector (GRaND) reveal that Ceres accelerates electrons from the solar wind; the most accepted hypothesis is that these electrons are being accelerated by collisions between the solar wind and a tenuous water vapour exosphere. Bow shocks like these could also be explained by a transient magnetic field, but this is considered less likely, as the interior of Ceres is not thought to be sufficiently electrically conductive. Ceres's thin exosphere is continuously replenished through exposure of water ice patches by impacts, water ice diffusion through the porous ice crust and proton sputtering during solar activity. The rate of this vapour diffusion scales with grain size and is heavily affected by a global dust mantle consisting of an aggregate of approximately 1 micron particles. Exospheric replenishment through sublimation alone is very small, with the current outgassing rate being only 0.003 kg/s. Various models of an extant exosphere have been attempted including ballistic trajectory, DSMC, and polar cap numerical models. Results showed a water exosphere half-life of 7 hours from the ballistic trajectory model, an outgassing rate of 6 kg/s with an optically thin atmosphere sustained for tens of days using a DSMC model, and seasonal polar caps formed from exosphere water delivery using the polar cap model. The mobility of water molecules within the exosphere is dominated by ballistic hops coupled with interaction of the surface, however less is known about direct interactions with planetary regoliths.

== Origin and evolution ==
Ceres is a surviving protoplanet that formed 4.56 billion years ago; alongside Pallas and Vesta, one of only three remaining in the inner Solar System, with the rest either merging to form terrestrial planets, being shattered in collisions or being ejected by Jupiter. Despite Ceres's current location, its composition is not consistent with having formed within the asteroid belt. It seems rather that it formed between the orbits of Jupiter and Saturn, and was deflected into the asteroid belt as Jupiter migrated outward. The discovery of ammonium salts in Occator Crater supports an origin in the outer Solar System, as ammonia is far more abundant in that region.

The early geological evolution of Ceres was dependent on the heat sources available during and after its formation: impact energy from planetesimal accretion and decay of radionuclides (possibly including short-lived extinct radionuclides such as aluminium-26). These may have been sufficient to allow Ceres to differentiate into a rocky planetary core and icy mantle, or even a liquid water ocean, soon after its formation. This ocean should have left an icy layer under the surface as it froze. The fact that Dawn found no evidence of such a layer suggests that Ceres's original crust was at least partially destroyed by later impacts thoroughly mixing the ice with the salts and silicate-rich material of the ancient seafloor and the material beneath.

Ceres possesses surprisingly few large craters, suggesting that viscous relaxation and cryovolcanism have erased older geological features. The presence of clays and carbonates requires chemical reactions at temperatures above 50 °C, consistent with hydrothermal activity.

It has become considerably less geologically active over time, with a surface dominated by impact craters; nevertheless, evidence from Dawn reveals that internal processes have continued to sculpt Ceres's surface to a significant extent contrary to predictions that Ceres's small size would have ceased internal geological activity early in its history.

== Habitability ==
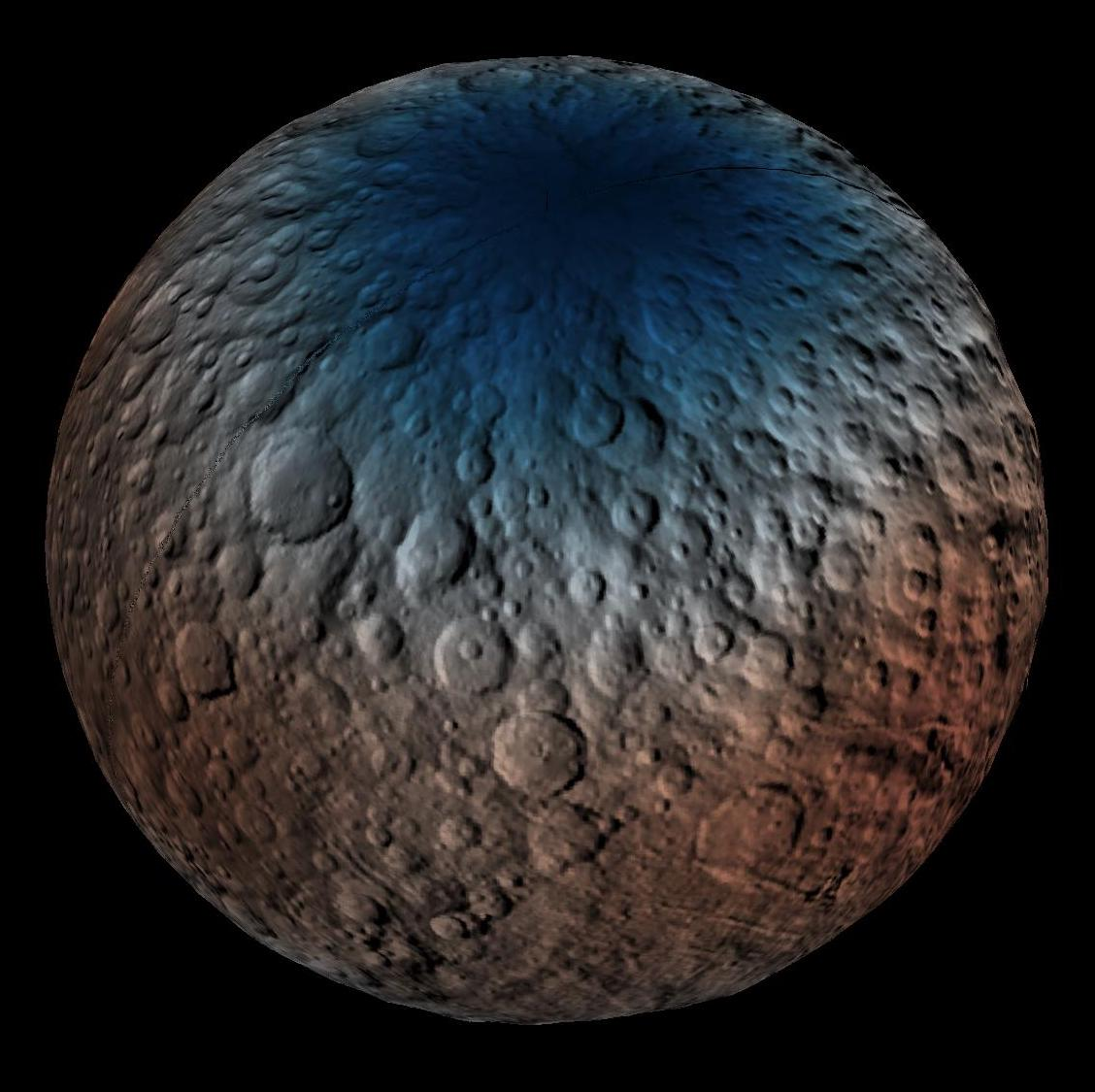
Hydrogen concentration (blue) in the upper metre of the regolith indicating presence of water ice

Although Ceres is not as actively discussed as a potential home for microbial extraterrestrial life as Mars, Europa, Enceladus, or Titan are, it has the most water of any body in the inner Solar System after Earth, and the likely brine pockets under its surface could provide habitats for life. Unlike Europa or Enceladus, it does not experience tidal heating, but it is close enough to the Sun and contains enough long-lived radioactive isotopes to preserve liquid water in its subsurface for extended periods. The remote detection of organic compounds and the presence of water mixed with 20% carbon by mass in its near surface could provide conditions favourable to organic chemistry. Of the biochemical elements, Ceres is rich in carbon, hydrogen, oxygen and nitrogen, but phosphorus has yet to be detected, and sulfur, despite being suggested by Hubble UV observations, was not detected by Dawn.

== Observation and exploration ==
=== Observation ===
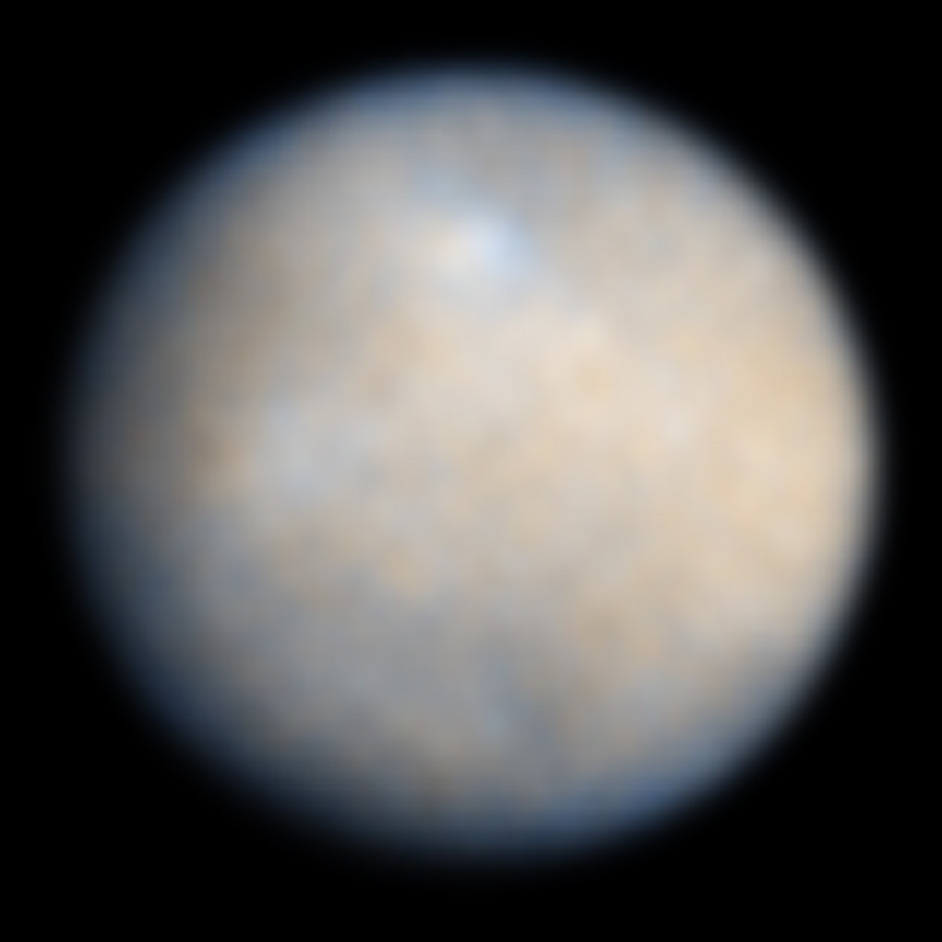
An enhanced Hubble image of Ceres, the best acquired by a telescope, taken in 2004

When in opposition near its perihelion, Ceres can reach an apparent magnitude of +6.7. This is too dim to be visible to the average naked eye, but under ideal viewing conditions, keen eyes may be able to see it. Vesta is the only other asteroid that can regularly reach a similarly bright magnitude, while Pallas and 7 Iris do so only when both in opposition and near perihelion. When in conjunction, Ceres has a magnitude of around +9.3, which corresponds to the faintest objects visible with 10×50 binoculars; thus, it can be seen with such binoculars in a naturally dark and clear night sky around new moon.

An occultation of the star BD+8°471 by Ceres was observed on 13 November 1984 in Mexico, Florida and across the Caribbean, allowing better measurements of its size, shape and albedo. On 25 June 1995, Hubble obtained ultraviolet images of Ceres with 50 km (30 mi) resolution. In 2002, the W. M. Keck Observatory obtained infrared images with 30 km (20 mi) resolution using adaptive optics.

Before the Dawn mission, only a few surface features had been unambiguously detected on Ceres. High-resolution ultraviolet Hubble images in 1995 showed a dark spot on its surface, which was nicknamed "Piazzi" in honour of the discoverer of Ceres. It was thought to be a crater. Visible-light images of a full rotation taken by Hubble in 2003 and 2004 showed eleven recognisable surface features, the natures of which were undetermined. One of them corresponded to the Piazzi feature. Near-infrared images over a whole rotation, taken with adaptive optics by the Keck Observatory in 2012, showed bright and dark features moving with Ceres's rotation. Two dark features were circular and were presumed to be craters; one was observed to have a bright central region, and the other was identified as the Piazzi feature. Dawn eventually revealed Piazzi to be a dark region in the middle of Vendimia Planitia, close to the crater Dantu, and the other dark feature to be within Hanami Planitia and close to Occator Crater.

=== Dawn mission ===
Animation of Dawn's trajectory around Ceres from 1 February 2015 to 1 February 2025 Dawn · Ceres

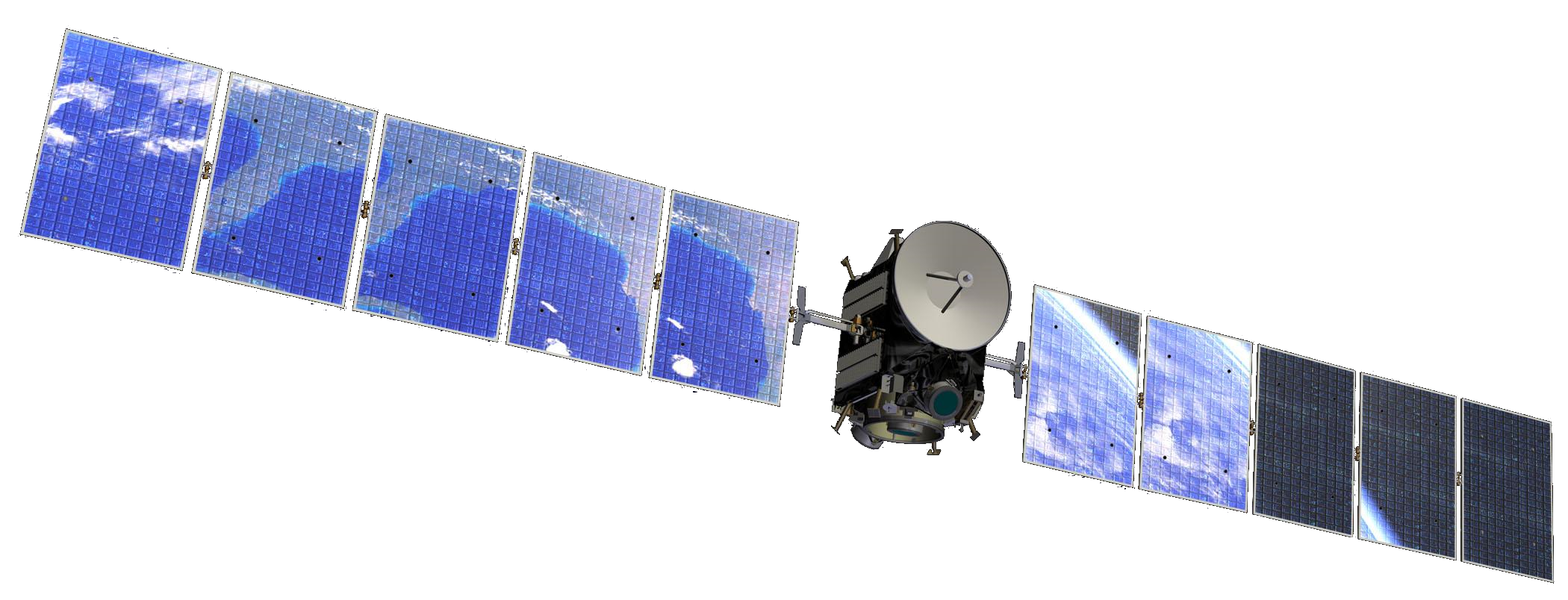
Artist's conception of Dawn spacecraft

In the early 1990s, NASA initiated the Discovery Program, which was intended to be a series of low-cost scientific missions. In 1996, the program's study team proposed a high-priority mission to explore the asteroid belt using a spacecraft with an ion thruster. Funding remained problematic for nearly a decade, but by 2004, the Dawn vehicle passed its critical design review.

Dawn, the first space mission to visit either Vesta or Ceres, was launched on 27 September 2007. On 3 May 2011, Dawn acquired its first targeting image 1,200,000 km (750,000 mi) from Vesta. After orbiting Vesta for thirteen months, Dawn used its ion thruster to depart for Ceres, with gravitational capture occurring on 6 March 2015 at a separation of 61,000 km (38,000 mi), four months before the New Horizons flyby of Pluto.

The spacecraft instrumentation included a framing camera, a visual and infrared spectrometer, and a gamma ray and neutron detector. These instruments examined Ceres's shape and elemental composition. On 13 January 2015, as Dawn approached Ceres, the spacecraft took its first images at near-Hubble resolution, revealing impact craters and a small high-albedo spot on the surface. Additional imaging sessions, at increasingly better resolution, took place from February to April.

Dawn's mission profile called for it to study Ceres from a series of circular polar orbits at successively lower altitudes. It entered its first observational orbit ("RC3") around Ceres at an altitude of 13,500 km (8,400 mi) on 23 April 2015, staying for only one orbit (15 days). The spacecraft then reduced its orbital distance to 4,400 km (2,700 mi) for its second observational orbit ("survey") for three weeks, then down to 1,470 km (910 mi) ("HAMO;" high altitude mapping orbit) for two months and then down to its final orbit at 375 km (233 mi) ("LAMO;" low altitude mapping orbit) for at least three months. In October 2015, NASA released a true-colour portrait of Ceres made by Dawn. In 2017, Dawn's mission was extended to perform a series of closer orbits around Ceres until the hydrazine used to maintain its orbit ran out.

Dawn soon discovered evidence of cryovolcanism. Two distinct bright spots (or high-albedo features) inside a crater (different from the bright spots observed in earlier Hubble images) were seen in a 19 February 2015 image, leading to speculation about a possible cryovolcanic origin or outgassing. On 2 September 2016, scientists from the Dawn team argued in a Science paper that Ahuna Mons was the strongest evidence yet for cryovolcanic features on Ceres. On 11 May 2015, NASA released a higher-resolution image showing that the spots were composed of multiple smaller spots. On 9 December 2015, NASA scientists reported that the bright spots on Ceres may be related to a type of salt, particularly a form of brine containing magnesium sulfate hexahydrate (MgSO_{4}·6H_{2}O); the spots were also found to be associated with ammonia-rich clays. In June 2016, near-infrared spectra of these bright areas were found to be consistent with a large amount of sodium carbonate (Na_{2}CO_{3}), implying that recent geologic activity was probably involved in the creation of the bright spots.

From June to October 2018, Dawn orbited Ceres from as close as 35 km (22 mi) to as far away as 4,000 km (2,500 mi). The Dawn mission ended on 1 November 2018 after the spacecraft ran out of fuel.

=== Future missions ===
In 2020, an ESA team proposed the Calathus Mission concept, a followup mission to Occator Crater, to return a sample of the bright carbonate faculae and dark organics to Earth. The China National Space Administration is designing a sample-return mission from Ceres that would take place during the 2020s.

== See also ==
- List of exceptional asteroids
- List of Solar System objects by size
- List of former planets
