= Dynamic method =

Procedure to determine asteroid masses

The dynamic method is a procedure for the determination of the masses of asteroids. The procedure gets its name from its use of the Newtonian laws of the dynamics, or motion, of asteroids as they move around the Solar System. The procedure works by taking multiple position measurements to determine the gravitational deflection caused when two or more asteroids move past each other. The method relies on the fact that the large number of known asteroids means they will occasionally move past one another at very close distances. If at least one of the two interacting bodies is large enough, its gravitational influence on the other can reveal its mass. The accuracy of the determined mass is limited by the precision and timing of the appropriate astrometric observations being made to determine the gravitational deflection caused by a given interaction.

Because the method relies on detecting the amount of gravitational deflection induced during an interaction, the procedure works best for objects which will produce a large deflection in their interactions with other objects. This means that the procedure works best for large objects, but it can also be effectively applied to objects which have repeated close interactions with each other such as when the two objects are in orbital resonance with one another. Regardless of the mass of the interacting objects, the amount of deflection will be greater if the objects approach nearer to each other and it will also be greater if the objects pass slowly, allowing more time for gravity to perturb the orbits of the two objects. For large enough asteroids this distance can be as large as ~0.1 AU, for less massive asteroids the conditions of the interaction would need to be correspondingly better.

== Mathematical analysis ==
The simplest way to describe the deflection of the asteroids is in the case where one object is significantly more massive than the other. In this case the equations of motion are the same as for that of Rutherford scattering between oppositely charged objects (so that the force is attractive rather than repulsive). When rewritten in the more familiar notation used in celestial mechanics deflection angle can be related to the eccentricity of the hyperbolic orbit of the smaller object relative to the larger one by the following formula:

$$\sin \left( \frac{\Theta}{2} \right) = \frac{1}{\epsilon}$$

Here $\Theta$ is the angle between the asymptotes of the hyperbolic orbit of the small object relative to the large one, and $\epsilon$ is the eccentricity of this orbit (which must be greater than 1 for a hyperbolic orbit).

A more sophisticated description using matrices can be achieved by separating the observed objects position on the sky as a function of time into the sum of two components: one which is a result of the relative motion of the objects themselves, and the other the motion induced by the gravitational influence of the two bodies. The relative contributions of the two terms in the best fit of this equation onto the actual observations of the objects yields the objects masses.
