= Gauss separation algorithm =

Carl Friedrich Gauss, in his treatise Allgemeine Theorie des Erdmagnetismus, presented a method, the Gauss separation algorithm, of partitioning the magnetic field vector, B$(r, \theta, \phi)$, measured over the surface of a sphere into two components, internal and external, arising from electric currents (per the Biot–Savart law) flowing in the volumes interior and exterior to the spherical surface, respectively. The method employs spherical harmonics. When radial currents flow through the surface of interest, the decomposition is more complex, involving the decomposition of the field into poloidal and toroidal components. In this case, an additional term (the toroidal component) accounts for the contribution of the radial current to the magnetic field on the surface.

The method is commonly used in studies of terrestrial and planetary magnetism, to relate measurements of magnetic fields either at the planetary surface or in orbit above the planet to currents flowing in the planet's interior (internal currents) and its magnetosphere (external currents). Ionospheric currents would be exterior to the planet's surface, but might be internal currents from the vantage point of a satellite orbiting the planent.
