= Enceladus Life Signatures and Habitability =

Astrobiology concept mission

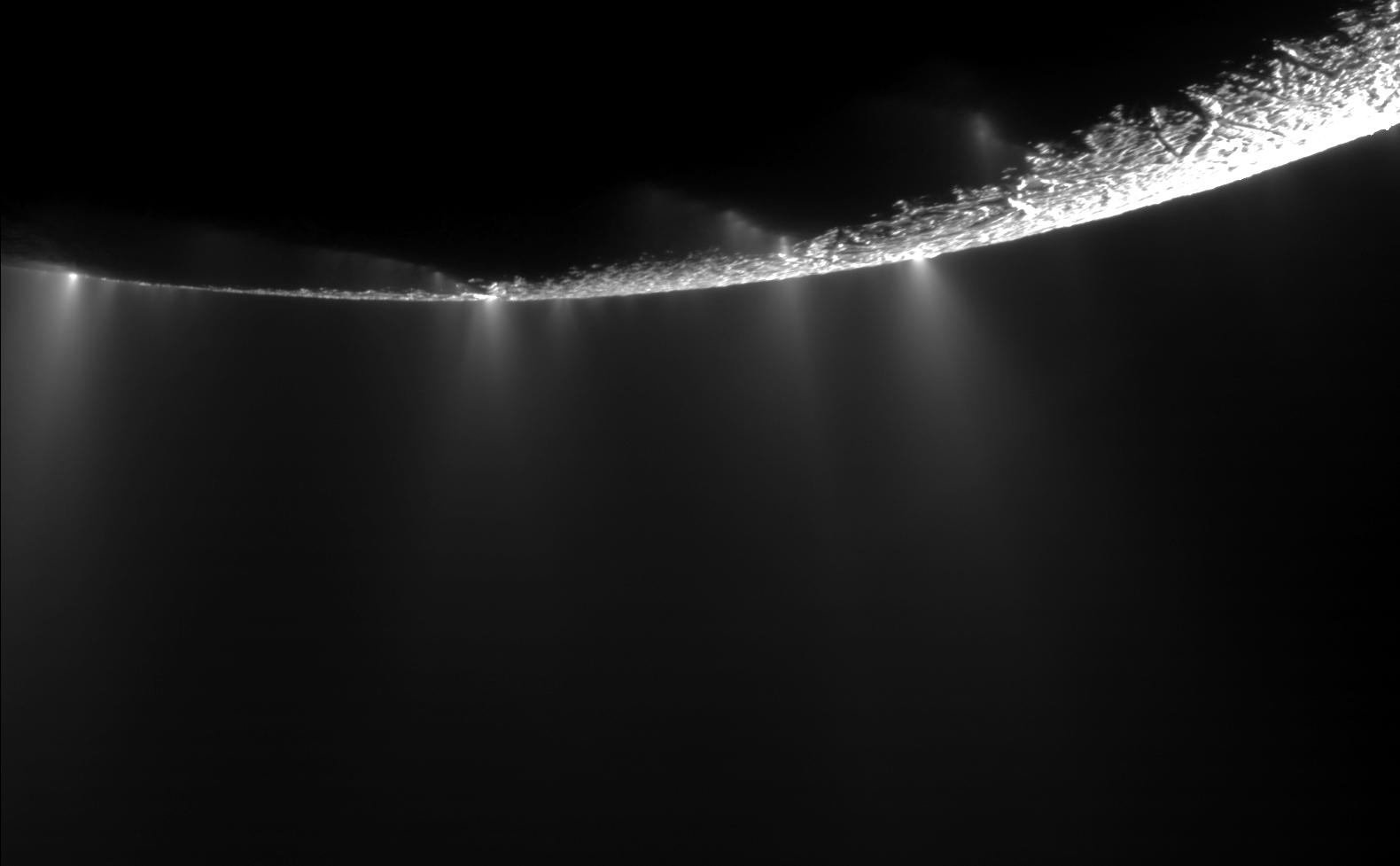
Enceladus's south pole - Geysers spray water from many locations along the 'tiger stripes' feature

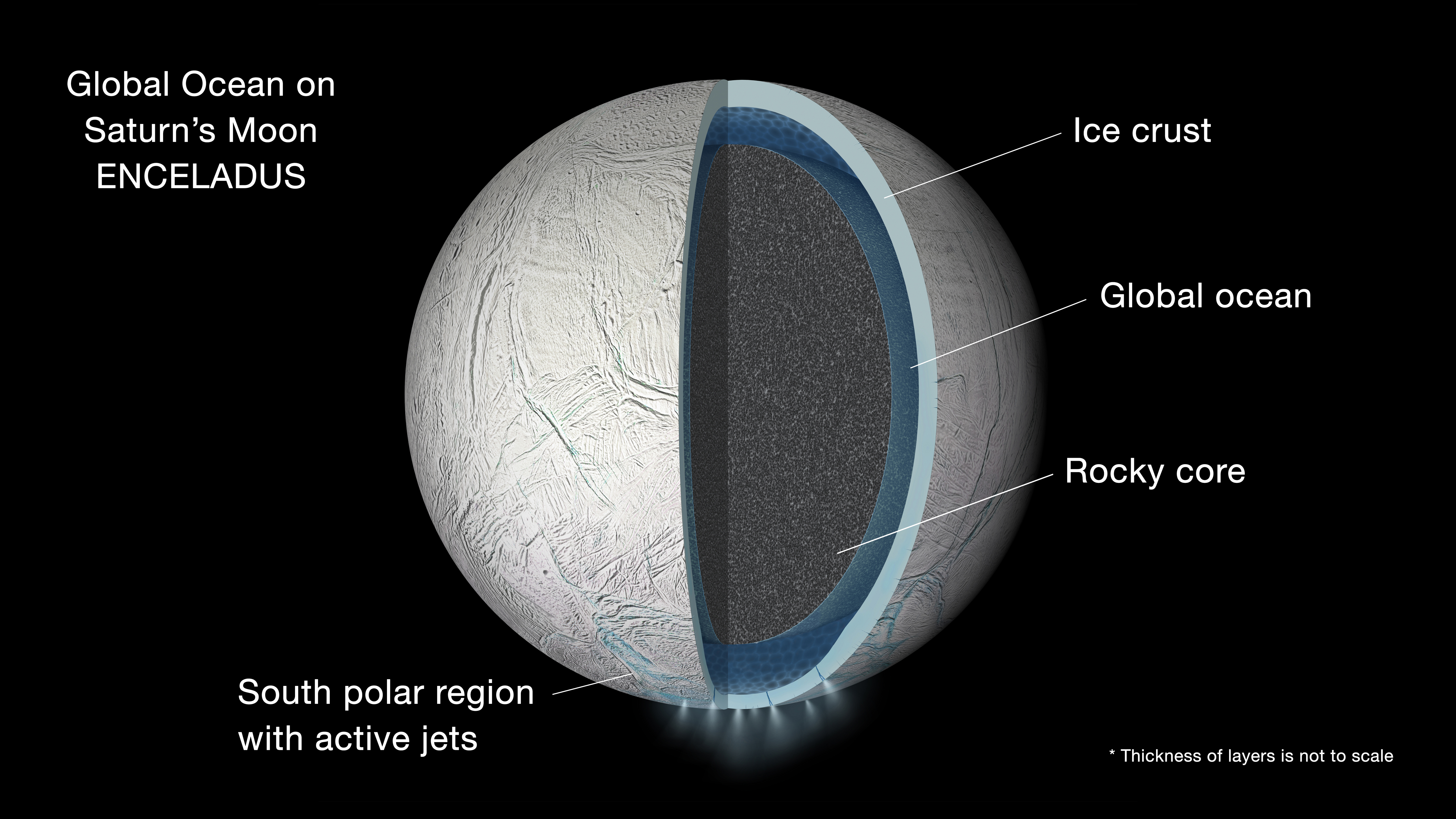
Artist's impression of possible hydrothermal activity on Enceladus

Enceladus Life Signatures and Habitability (ELSAH) is an astrobiology concept mission proposed in 2017 to NASA's New Frontiers program to send a spacecraft to Enceladus to search for biosignatures and assess its habitability. The Principal Investigator is Christopher P. McKay, an astrobiologist at NASA Ames Research Center, and the managing NASA center is Goddard Space Flight Center. No details of the mission have been made public, but observers speculate that it would be a plume-sampling orbiter mission.

The two finalists, announced on 20 December 2017, are Dragonfly to Titan, and CAESAR (Comet Astrobiology Exploration Sample Return) which is a sample-return mission from comet 67P/Churyumov–Gerasimenko.

Although ELSAH was not selected for launch in this instance, it received technology development funds to prepare it for future mission competitions. The funds are meant to develop techniques that limit spacecraft contamination and thereby enable life detection measurements on cost-capped missions.

== See also ==
- Enceladus Explorer (En-Ex)
- Enceladus Life Finder (ELF)
- Explorer of Enceladus and Titan (E^{2}T)
- Journey to Enceladus and Titan (JET)
- Life Investigation For Enceladus (LIFE)
- THEO
