= Enceladus Icy Jet Analyzer =

Time-of-flight mass spectrometer

The Enceladus Icy Jet Analyzer (ENIJA) is a time-of-flight mass spectrometer developed to search for prebiotic molecules like amino acids and biosignatures in the plumes of Saturn's moon Enceladus.

Most of the ice particles in Enceladus's plume have been shown to be direct samples of subsurface waters, offering an opportunity to assess its internal ocean's geochemical and habitability potential without having to land and drill through the ice.

The ENIJA instrument has been formally proposed to fly on two missions: the Enceladus Life Finder (ELF), and on the Explorer of Enceladus and Titan (E^{2}T).

== Description ==
The instrument is based on the principle of impact ionization and is optimized for the analysis of high dust fluxes and number densities as typically occur during Enceladus plume crossings. Impact ionization shows an excellent sensitivity for compounds embedded in a water ice matrix. Ice particles as small as 0.1 μm at an impact speed of 5 km/s can be analyzed.

The mass resolution is > 970 m/dm for typical plume particles in the size range 0.01 to 100 μm. Detection of elemental and molecular species over such a wide mass range permits clear characterization of particle chemistry, simultaneously covering individual ions like H^{+}, C^{−}, O, and complex organics with masses of many hundred Da. ENIJA records time-of-flight mass spectra in the range between 1 and 2000 Da. Up to 50 spectra are recorded per second. The instrument has a mass of 3.5 kg, and peak power is 14.2 W.
