= THEO =

Orbiter mission to Enceladus

- Names: Testing the Habitability of Enceladus's Ocean (THEO)
- Mission type: Astrobiology reconnaissance
- Operator: NASA
- Mission duration: proposed: 6-month science phase

Spacecraft properties
- Spacecraft: THEO
- Payload mass: ≈80 kg
- Dimensions: cylindrical: 4.5 m height × 1. m diameter
- Power: 594 W from a 72 m^{2} solar array

Start of mission
- Launch date: 2024 if selected for development

End of mission
- Disposal: proposed deorbit onto Tethys

Enceladus orbiter
- Orbits: >600

THEO (Testing the Habitability of Enceladus's Ocean) is a feasibility study for a New Frontiers class orbiter mission to Enceladus that would directly sample its south pole water plumes in order to study its internal habitability and to search for biosignatures. Specifically, it would take advantage of the direct sampling opportunities of a subsurface ocean.

The study concept was produced by the 2015 Jet Propulsion Laboratory Planetary Science Summer School under the guidance of TeamX. The study has not yet been formally proposed for funding.

== Mission concept ==
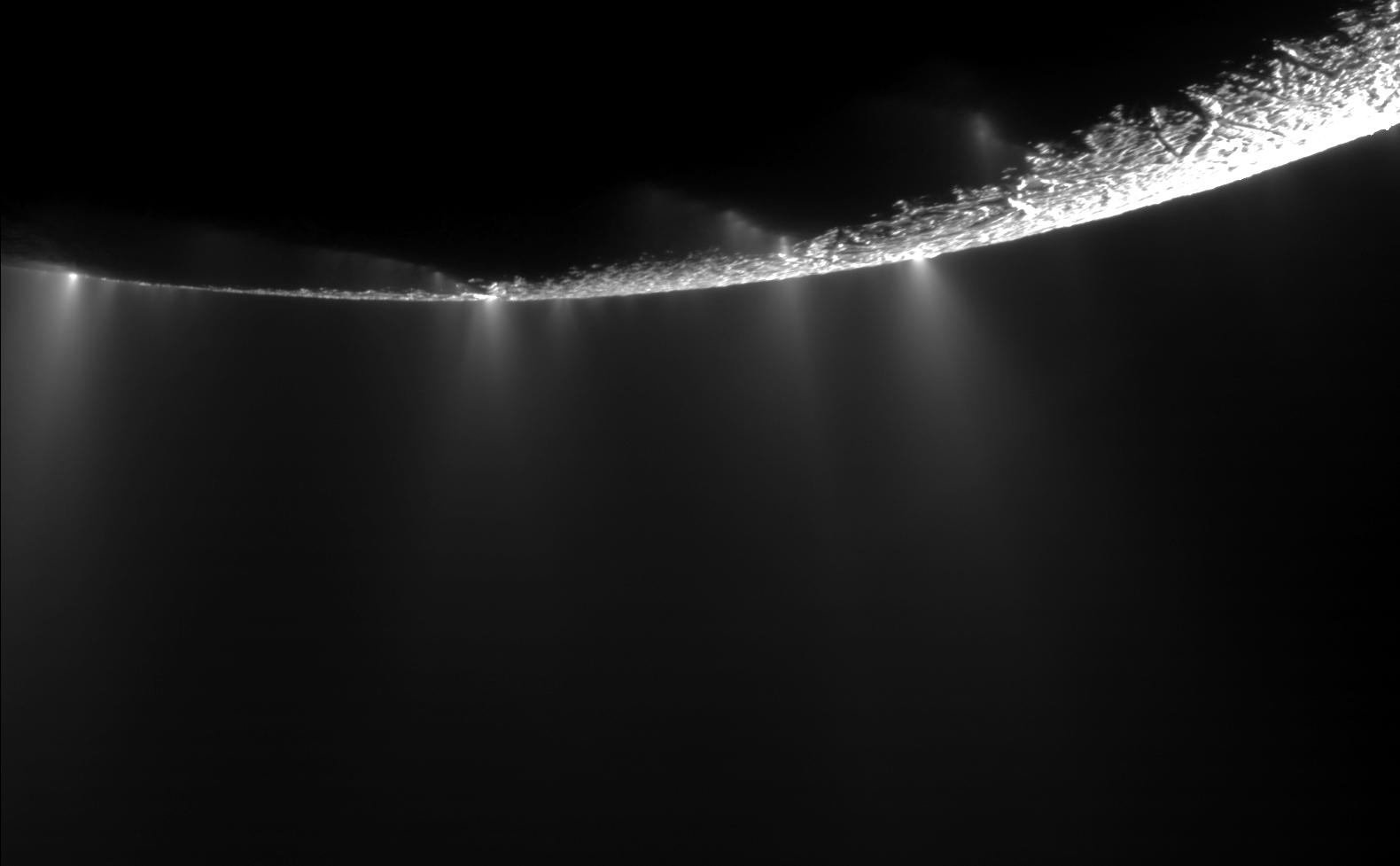
Enceladus's south pole - Geysers spray water from many locations along the 'tiger stripes' feature.

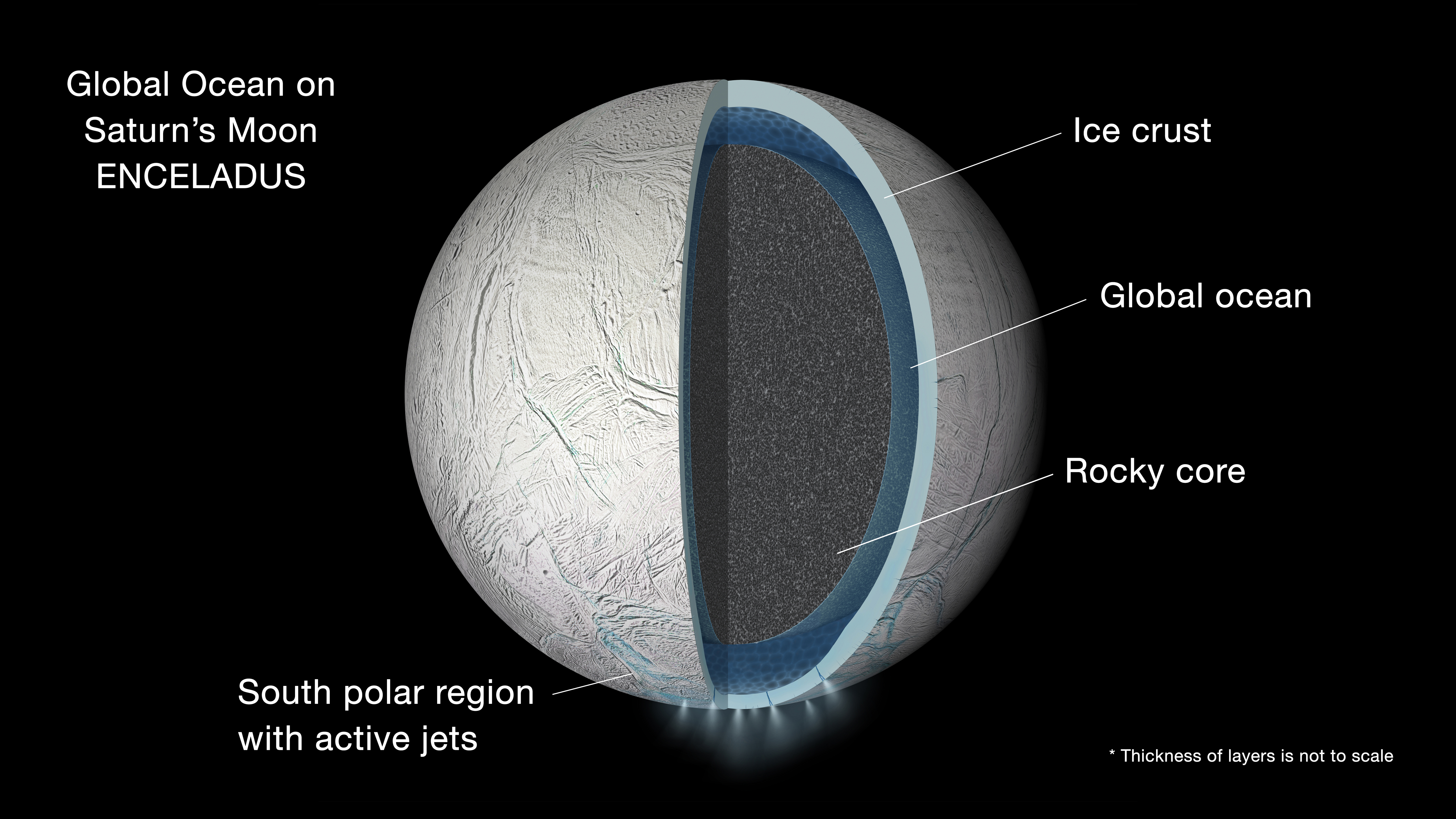
Artist's impression of possible hydrothermal activity on Enceladus.

A plume of water vapor and ice spews from Enceladus's south polar region, offering a unique opportunity for a low-cost mission in the search for life and habitable environments beyond Earth. The THEO mission would further understanding of life and habitability in the Solar System by addressing (i) the limits of life under colder, fainter Sun conditions, (ii) the importance of hydrothermal alteration in the origin of life, and (iii) the distribution of molecules in the Solar System that may have served as the precursors for life.

The Cassini mission data suggest that this plume, sourced by a liquid reservoir beneath the moon's icy crust, contain organics, salts, and water-rock interaction derivatives. Thus, the ingredients for life as we know it are available in Enceladus's subsurface ocean.

The THEO mission would primarily focus on whether Enceladus is habitable. It would not look for life forms directly, but for higher abundances of certain molecules, ratios of organic compounds, or chains of amino acids could all be biosignatures that all give away the presence of life.

== Mission design ==
The trajectory of THEO would obtain the needed kinetic energy with one Venus and two Earth gravity assists. THEO would reduce its velocity (delta-v) by making flybys of Saturn moons Titan, Rhea, Dione, Tethys, and Enceladus before the Enceladus orbit insertion. The data would be collected from three orbital attitudes (500 km, 100 km, 30 km) with each representing a separate mission phase. More than 600 science orbits are expected over the span of nominal six-month mission. At the end of the mission, and according to planetary protection protocols, the orbiter will be sent on an impact trajectory to Tethys, where it will be discarded.

== Proposed payload ==
This mission concept includes remote sensing and in situ analyses with:

- a mass spectrometer (SWAMP)
- a sub-mm radiometer-spectrometer (WAVES)
- a camera (DRIPS)
- a magnetometer (OSMOSIS)
- doppler tracking (GEISER)

These instruments (total mass ≈80 kg) were selected to address four key questions for ascertaining the habitability of Enceladus's ocean within the context of the moon's geological activity:

1. How are the plumes and ocean connected?
2. Are the abiotic conditions of the ocean suitable for habitability?
3. How stable is the ocean environment?
4. Is there evidence of biological processes?

== See also ==
- Abiogenesis
- Astrobiology
- Enceladus Explorer (EnEx)
- Enceladus Life Finder (ELF)
- Enceladus Life Signatures and Habitability (ELSAH)
- Europa Clipper
- Explorer of Enceladus and Titan (E^{2}T)
- Journey to Enceladus and Titan (JET)
- Life Investigation For Enceladus (LIFE)
