= Breakthrough Enceladus mission =

Astrobiology mission

Breakthrough Enceladus is a proposed privately funded astrobiology mission by Breakthrough Initiatives founded by Yuri Milner. Its aim is to assess the possibility of life on Saturn's moon Enceladus.

== History ==
NASA will be “providing expert reviewers and feedback on their design". Corey S. Powell, editor-in-chief of Discover magazine, reporting for NBC News stated that the mission was particularly notable as it would "rewrite the rules of space exploration," being potentially the first to find proof of complex non-Earth life in the Solar System, as it is "riskier than anything NASA would attempt on its own."

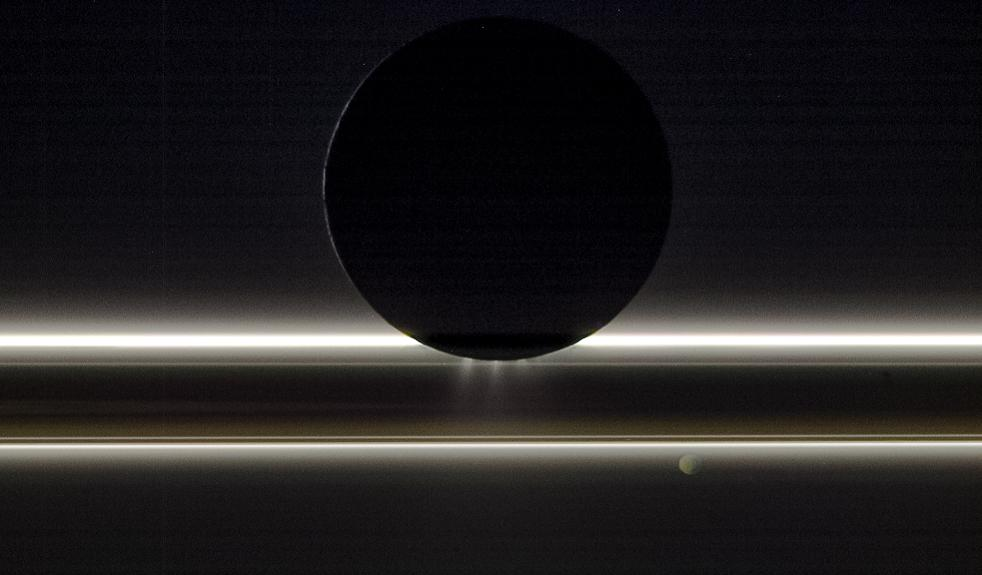
Saturn's moon Enceladus ejecting plumes of water from its South Pole photographed by Cassini spacecraft's narrow-angle camera at a distance of approximately 149,600 miles

Christopher McKay, a planetary scientist, at NASA Ames Research Center has compared Breakthrough Enceladus to Magellan's circumnavigation of the globe, and Richard Byrd’s pole expeditions, that "would create a new paradigm for exploration.”

The privately funded probe is estimated to take a decade to build and cost $60 million, while a NASA government funded approach could take over two decades and cost 15 times as much. On 13 September 2018, Thomas Zurbuchen of NASA signed a Pre-Phase A partnership agreement, with Breakthrough Prize Foundation's chairman Pete Worden to jointly create the mission concept and plan.

The mission is the first privately funded deep space mission.

The flyby mission proposes to search for microbes in the plumes of water that are being ejected from Enceladus's warm ocean, veiled under a layer of ice crust on its south pole. According to a study published in Geophysical Research Letters, Enceladus's ice crust is believed to be two to five kilometers thick, (thinner than Europa's ice layer, estimated to be 19 to 25 kilometers thick), and could permit a probe to use ice-penetrating radar, to investigate the contents of the Enceladian ocean.

No updates have been published since 2018.
