= Journey to Enceladus and Titan =

Proposed NASA mission to Saturn's moons

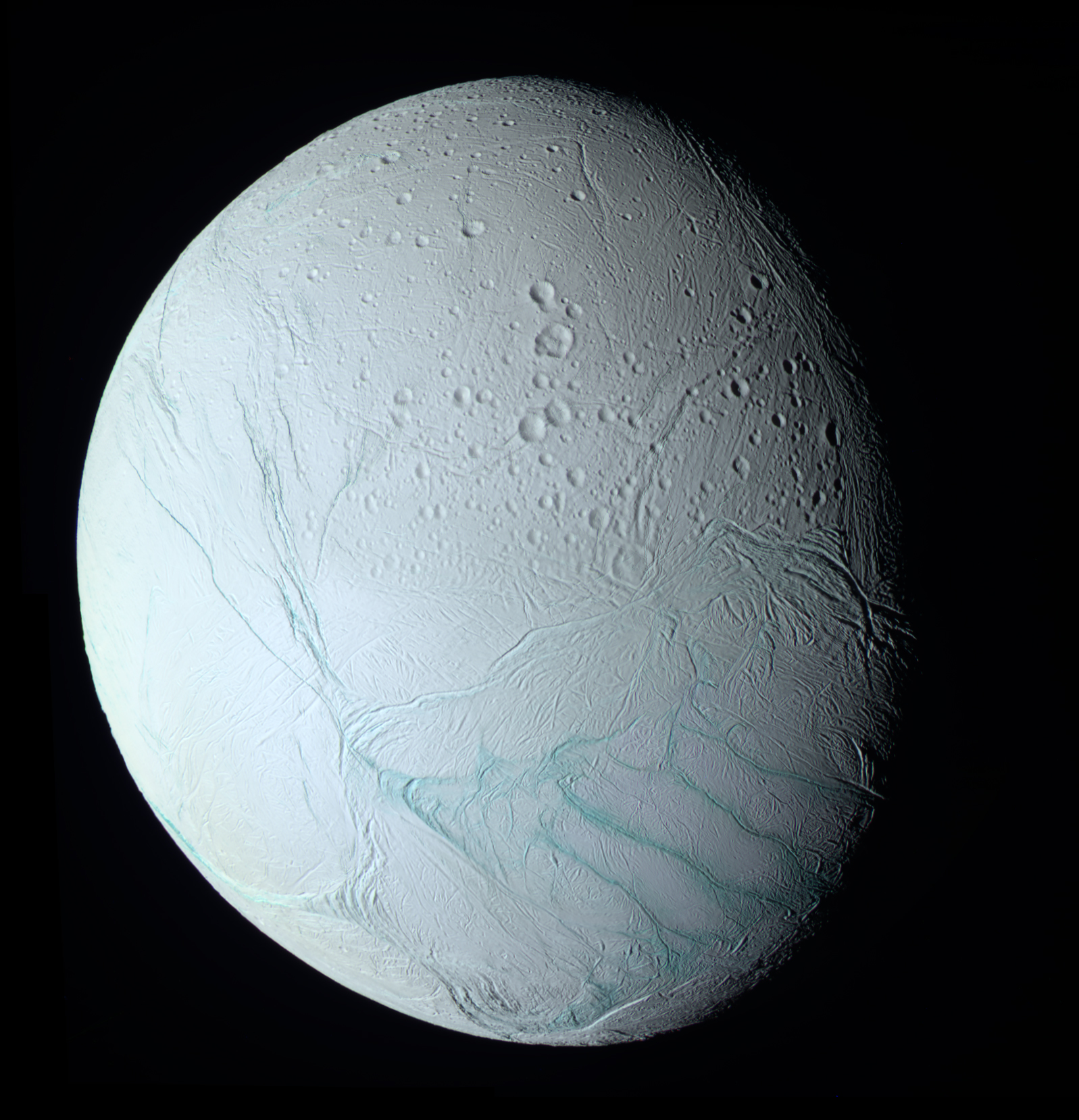
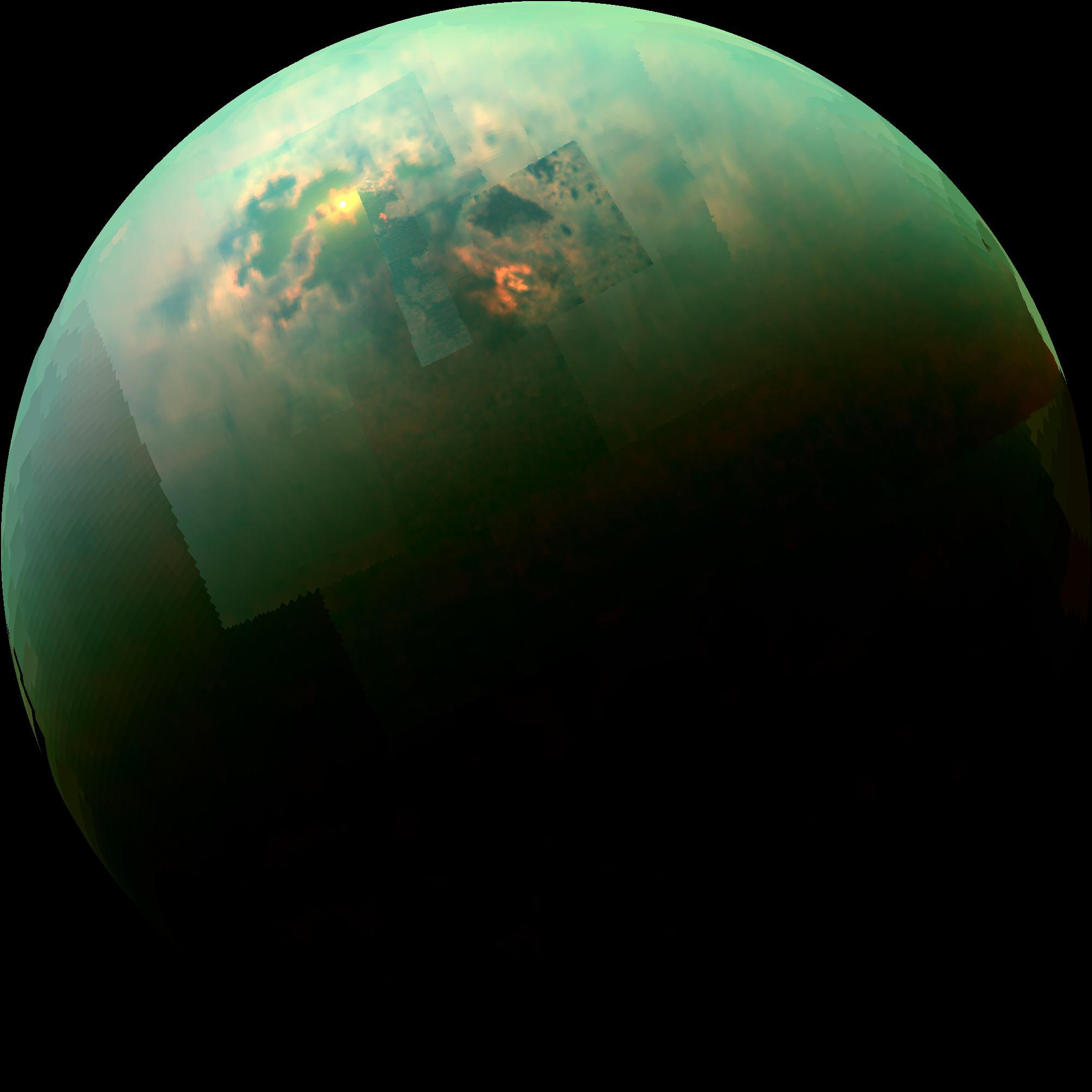
- Enceladus and Titan as seen from the Cassini–Huygens mission
- Mission type: Saturn orbiter
- Operator: NASA / JPL
- Mission duration: 9.5 years (planned); 1 year (Science phase)

Spacecraft properties
- Power: ASRG

Start of mission
- Launch date: February 2016 (planned)
- Rocket: Atlas V

Saturn orbiter
- Orbital insertion: May 2023
Instruments
- TIGER: Titan Imaging and Geology, Enceladus Reconnaissance
- STEAM: Spectrometer for Titan and Enceladus Astrobiology Mission

Journey to Enceladus and Titan (JET) is an astrobiology mission concept to assess the habitability potential of Enceladus and Titan, moons of Saturn.

The JET orbiter concept was proposed in 2011 by the Jet Propulsion Laboratory to NASA's Discovery Program for its 13th mission, but it was not selected as a semi-finalist; Lucy was selected on 4 January 2017.

== Concept ==
Enceladus is a small icy moon, seemingly similar in chemical makeup to comets, with jets or geysers of water erupting from its surface that might be connected to active hydrothermal vents at its subsurface water ocean floor, where the moon's ocean meets the underlying rock, a prime habitat for life. The geysers could provide easy access for sampling the moon's subsurface ocean, and if there is microbial life in it, ice particles from the sea could contain the evidence astrobiologists need to identify them. An organic-rich world, Titan has a methane cycle comparable in atmospheric and geological processes to Earth's water cycle.

The JET orbiter mission concept was proposed in 2011 by the Jet Propulsion Laboratory to NASA's Discovery Program Mission #13. During the orbiter's one-year mission, it would perform high-resolution mass spectroscopy mapping that would determine what processes have shaped and are shaping the moons, and it would permit assessment of the habitability potential of Enceladus and Titan.

In order to meet the $450 million cost cap, the orbiter would carry only two instruments. It would orbit Saturn and make a total of 16 flybys of Enceladus and Titan, the closest ones at 900 km (560 mi) from Titan's surface. In June 2015 NASA announced a list of five finalists for the current competition, but the Journey to Enceladus and Titan proposal was not selected. Lucy was selected on 4 January 2017, and was launched in October 2021.

== Objectives ==
The three goals of the mission are to determine the processes that have shaped and are shaping Enceladus and Titan, to assess their astrobiological potential, and to investigate their formation and evolution.

At Enceladus, the mission will determine composition and flux of material in the plume, and will produce temperature maps of the faults, tectonics and interior dynamics. At Titan, it will characterize of the organic molecules in the upper atmosphere at different altitudes (> 900 km) and latitudes, and will produce high-resolution images for detailed study of features forming at different time-scales.

== Launch and trajectory ==
If using an Atlas V rocket, JET would reach Saturn in 8.5 years using a Venus–Earth–Earth gravity assist trajectory.

== Payload ==
The orbiter payload consists of two instruments:

- Infrared camera: 'Titan Imaging and Geology, Enceladus Reconnaissance' (TIGER) – This high-heritage thermographic camera exploits infrared wavelengths to image through Titan's thick atmosphere and would image the heat of Enceladus's fractures known as 'tiger stripes', permitting a detailed thermal modeling. It would provide 10× better imaging resolution of Titan's surface than Cassini, yielding 50 m/pix images of 15% of Titan's surface.
- Mass spectrometer: 'Spectrometer for Titan and Enceladus Astrobiology Mission' (STEAM) – It would characterize elements and molecules, including complex organic molecules with 100× higher resolution, and 1000× better sensitivity than Cassini. STEAM is the Rosetta flight-spare.

== See also ==
- Abiogenesis
- Discovery Program
- Enceladus Life Finder (ELF)
- Enceladus Explorer
- Europa Clipper
- Explorer of Enceladus and Titan (E^{2}T)
- Life Investigation For Enceladus (LIFE)
- THEO
