= Explorer of Enceladus and Titan =

NASA/ESA Saturnian moon probe concept

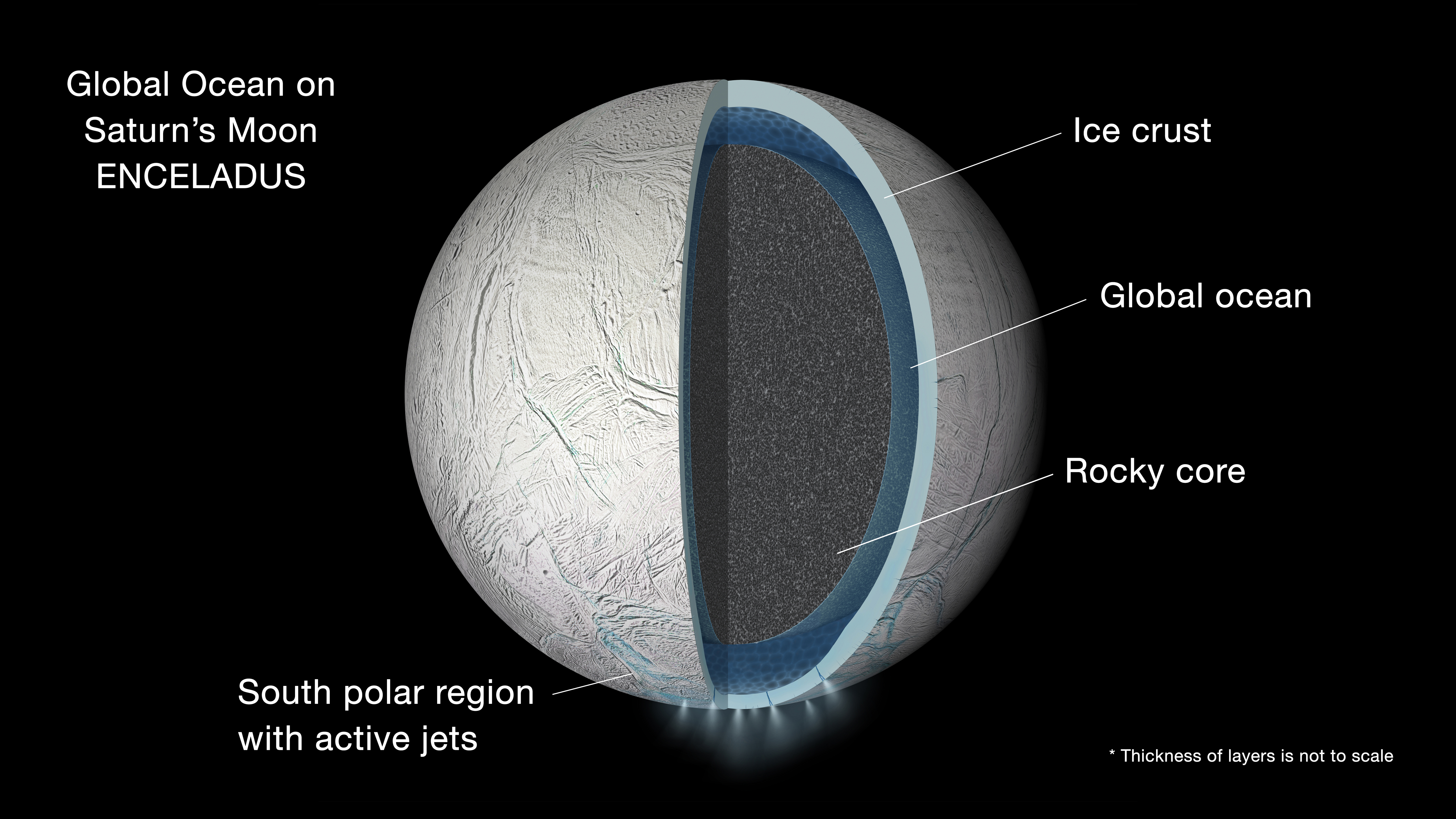
Artist's impression of possible hydrothermal activity on Enceladus

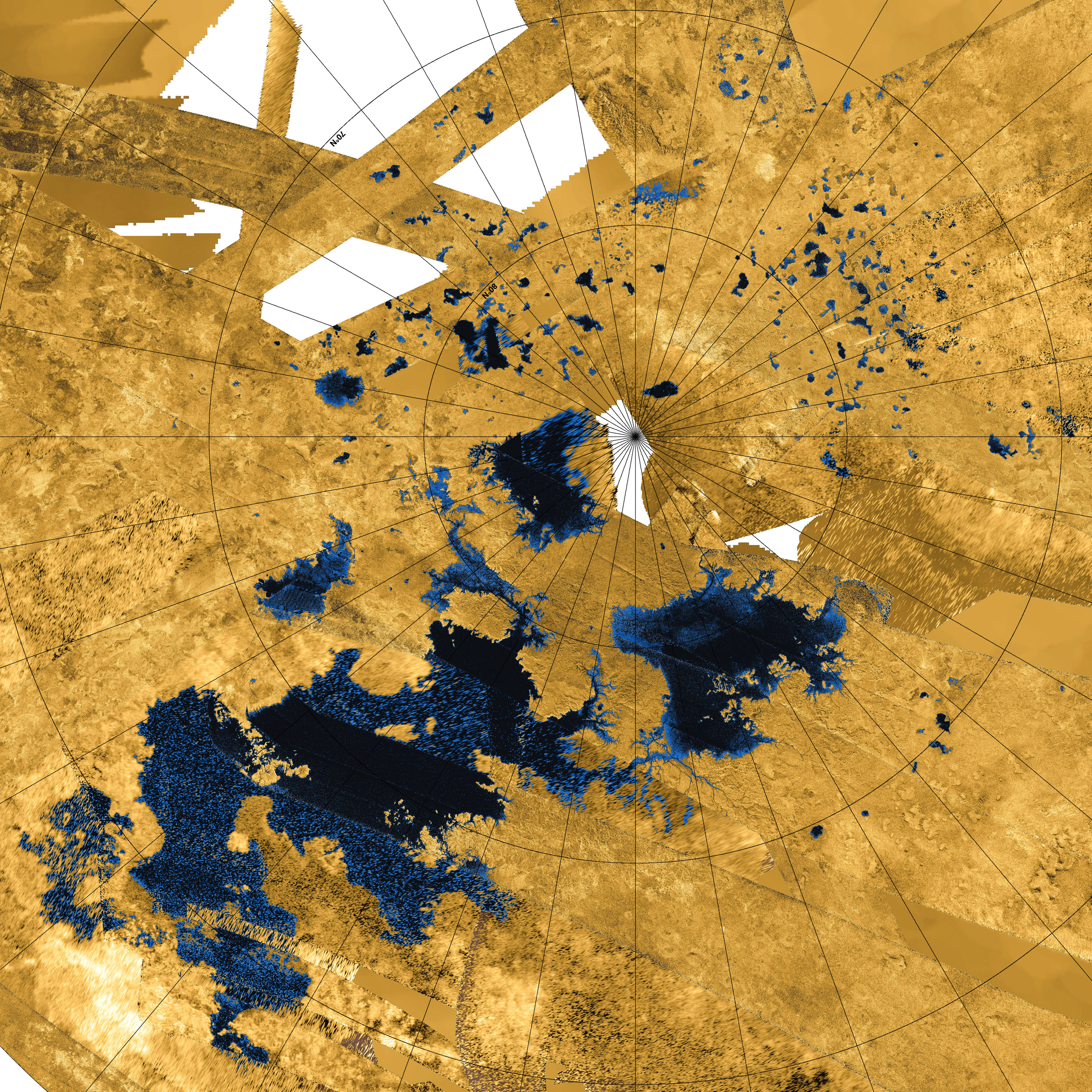
False-color, medium-resolution Cassini synthetic aperture radar mosaic of Titan's north polar region, showing hydrocarbon seas, lakes and tributary networks. Blue coloring indicates low radar reflectivity areas, caused by bodies of liquid ethane, methane and dissolved nitrogen.

Explorer of Enceladus and Titan (E^{2}T) is a space mission concept that would investigate the evolution and habitability of the Saturnian satellites Enceladus and Titan and is proposed by the European Space Agency in collaboration with NASA.

The proposed mission would address key scientific questions regarding extraterrestrial habitability, abiotic/prebiotic chemistry and emergence of life, which are among the highest priorities of ESA's Cosmic Vision program.

== Overview ==
The Explorer of Enceladus and Titan (E^{2}T) orbiter was first proposed in 2017 as a medium-class mission led by the European Space Agency in collaboration with NASA in response to ESA's M5 Cosmic Vision programme.

Both Enceladus and Titan harbour subsurface oceans that are prime environments in which to investigate the conditions for the emergence of life and the habitability potential of ocean worlds as well as the origin and evolution of unique complex planetary systems.

== Goals ==
The E^{2}T mission has three scientific goals:

- Investigate the origin and evolution of volatile-rich icy worlds by examining both Enceladus and Titan
- Investigate the habitability and potential for life in ocean worlds on both Enceladus and Titan
- Investigate Titan as an Earth-like world with an evolving climate and landscape.

These goals would be accomplished by measuring the nature, abundance and isotopic properties of solid- and vapor-phase species in Enceladus's plumes and Titan's upper atmosphere.

== Conceptual payload ==
The payload would provide in-situ sampling, high-resolution imaging and radio science measurements from multiple flybys of Enceladus and Titan using a solar-electric powered spacecraft in orbit around Saturn. The two main instruments proposed are the Ion and Neutral Gas Mass Spectrometer (INMS) and the Enceladus Icy Jet Analyzer (ENIJA); these high resolution mass spectrometers would provide the data needed to discern the subtle details of the aqueous environment of Enceladus from plume sampling and of the complex pre-biotic chemistry occurring in Titan's atmosphere.

The Titan Imaging and Geology, Enceladus Reconnaissance (TIGER) mid-wave infrared camera would map thermal emission from the plumes and Enceladus's tiger stripes at meter scales and investigate Titan's geomorphology at 50–100 m resolution.

The Radio Science Experiment (RSE) measurements would provide constraints on the ice shell structure and the properties of the internal oceans of Enceladus and Titan.

== Propulsion ==
The spacecraft concept calls for using an ion drive propulsion, proven to be extremely efficient and reliable. An ion thruster —or ion drive— is a form of electric propulsion that creates thrust by accelerating ions with electricity. The required electricity is generated by solar panels mounted on the spacecraft.

== See also ==
- Abiogenesis
- Astrobiology
- Enceladus Explorer
- Enceladus Life Finder (ELF)
- Europa Clipper
- Journey to Enceladus and Titan (JET)
- Life Investigation For Enceladus (LIFE)
- THEO
- TiME – Titan lake lander
