= Enceladus =

Natural satellite orbiting Saturn

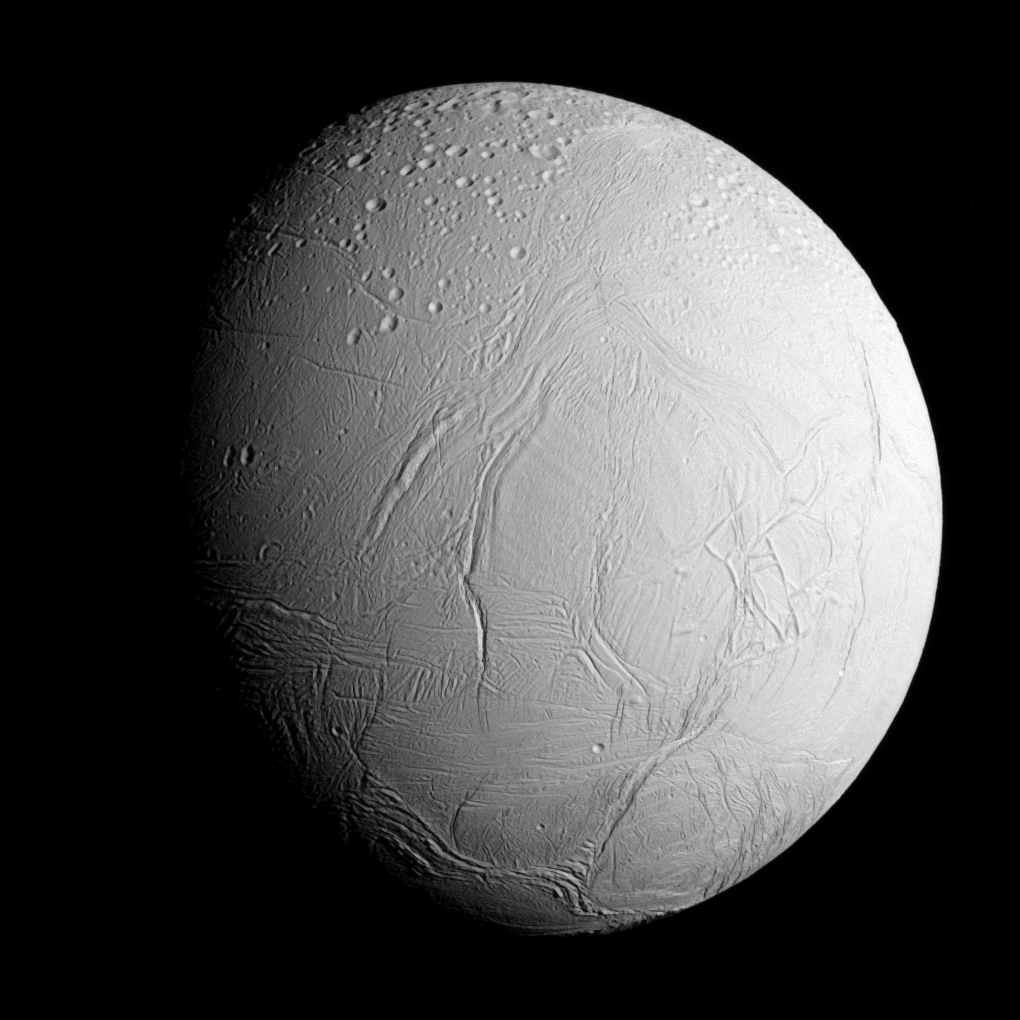
- Enceladus imaged by the Cassini orbiter, October 2015 (Note: Photograph of Enceladus, taken by the narrow-angle camera of the Imaging Science Subsystem (ISS) aboard Cassini, during the spacecraft's October 28, 2015, flyby. It shows the younger terrain of Sarandib and Diyar Planitia, populated with many grooves (sulci) and depressions (fossae). Older, cratered terrain can be seen towards Enceladus's north pole. The prominent feature visible near the south pole is Cashmere Sulci.)

Discovery
- Discovered by: William Herschel
- Discovery date: August 28, 1789

Designations
- Designation: Saturn II
- Pronunciation: /ɛnˈsɛlədəs/
- Named after: Ἐγκέλαδος Enkélados
- Adjectives: Enceladean /ɛnsəˈleɪdiən/

Orbital characteristics
- Periapsis: 236895 km
- Apoapsis: 239180 km
- Semi-major axis: 238037 km
- Eccentricity: 0.0047
- Orbital period (sidereal): 1.370218 d
- Inclination: 0.009° (to Saturn's equator)
- Satellite of: Saturn

Physical characteristics
- Dimensions: 512.42 × 502.78 × 497.26 km
- Mean radius: 252.04 km (Note: Best-fit sphere.) (0.0395 Earths, 0.1451 Moons)
- Mass: (1.080318±0.00028)×10^{20} kg (1.8×10^{−5} Earths)
- Mean density: 1.6097±0.0038 g/cm^{3}
- Surface gravity: 0.113 m/s^{2} (0.0116 g)
- Moment of inertia factor: 0.3305±0.0025
- Escape velocity: 0.239 km/s (860.4 km/h)
- Synodic rotation period: Synchronous
- Axial tilt: < 0.05°
- Albedo: 1.375±0.008 (geometric at 550 nm); 0.76±0.03 (bolometric Bond)
Surface temp.	min	mean	max
Kelvin	32.9 K	75 K	145 K
Celsius	−240 °C	−198 °C	−128 °C
- Apparent magnitude: 11.7

Atmosphere
- Surface pressure: Trace, significant spatial variability
- Composition by volume: 91% water vapour 4% nitrogen 3.2% carbon dioxide 1.7% methane

Enceladus is the sixth-largest moon of Saturn and the 18th largest in the Solar System. It is about 500 kilometres (310 miles) in diameter, about a tenth of that of Saturn's largest moon, Titan. It is covered by clean, freshly deposited snow hundreds of meters thick, making it one of the most reflective bodies of the Solar System. Consequently, its surface temperature at noon reaches only −198 °C (75.1 K; −324.4 °F), far colder than a light-absorbing body would be. Despite its small size, Enceladus has a wide variety of surface features, ranging from old, heavily cratered regions to young, tectonically deformed terrain.

Enceladus was discovered on August 28, 1789, by William Herschel, but little was known about it until the two Voyager spacecraft, Voyager 1 and Voyager 2, flew by Saturn in 1980 and 1981. In 2005, the spacecraft Cassini started multiple close flybys of Enceladus, revealing its surface and environment in greater detail. In particular, Cassini discovered water-rich plumes venting from the south polar region. Cryovolcanoes near the south pole shoot geyser-like jets of water vapour, molecular hydrogen, other volatiles, and solid material, including sodium chloride crystals and ice particles, into space, totalling about 200 kilograms (440 pounds) per second. More than 100 geysers have been identified. Some of the water vapour falls back as snow, now several hundred metres thick; the rest escapes and supplies most of the material making up Saturn's E ring. According to NASA scientists, the plumes are similar in composition to comets. In 2014, NASA reported that Cassini had found evidence for a large south polar subsurface ocean of liquid water with a thickness of around 10 km (6 mi). The existence of Enceladus's subsurface ocean has since been mathematically modelled and replicated.

These observations of active cryoeruptions, along with the finding of escaping internal heat and very few (if any) impact craters in the south polar region, show that Enceladus is currently geologically active. Like many other satellites in the extensive systems of the giant planets, Enceladus participates in an orbital resonance. Its resonance with Dione excites its orbital eccentricity, which is damped by tidal forces, tidally heating its interior and driving the geological activity.

Cassini performed chemical analysis of Enceladus's plumes, finding evidence for hydrothermal activity, possibly driving complex chemistry. Still-ongoing research suggests that Enceladus's hydrothermal environment could be habitable to some of Earth's hydrothermal vent microorganisms, and that plume-found methane could be produced by such organisms.

== History ==
=== Discovery ===
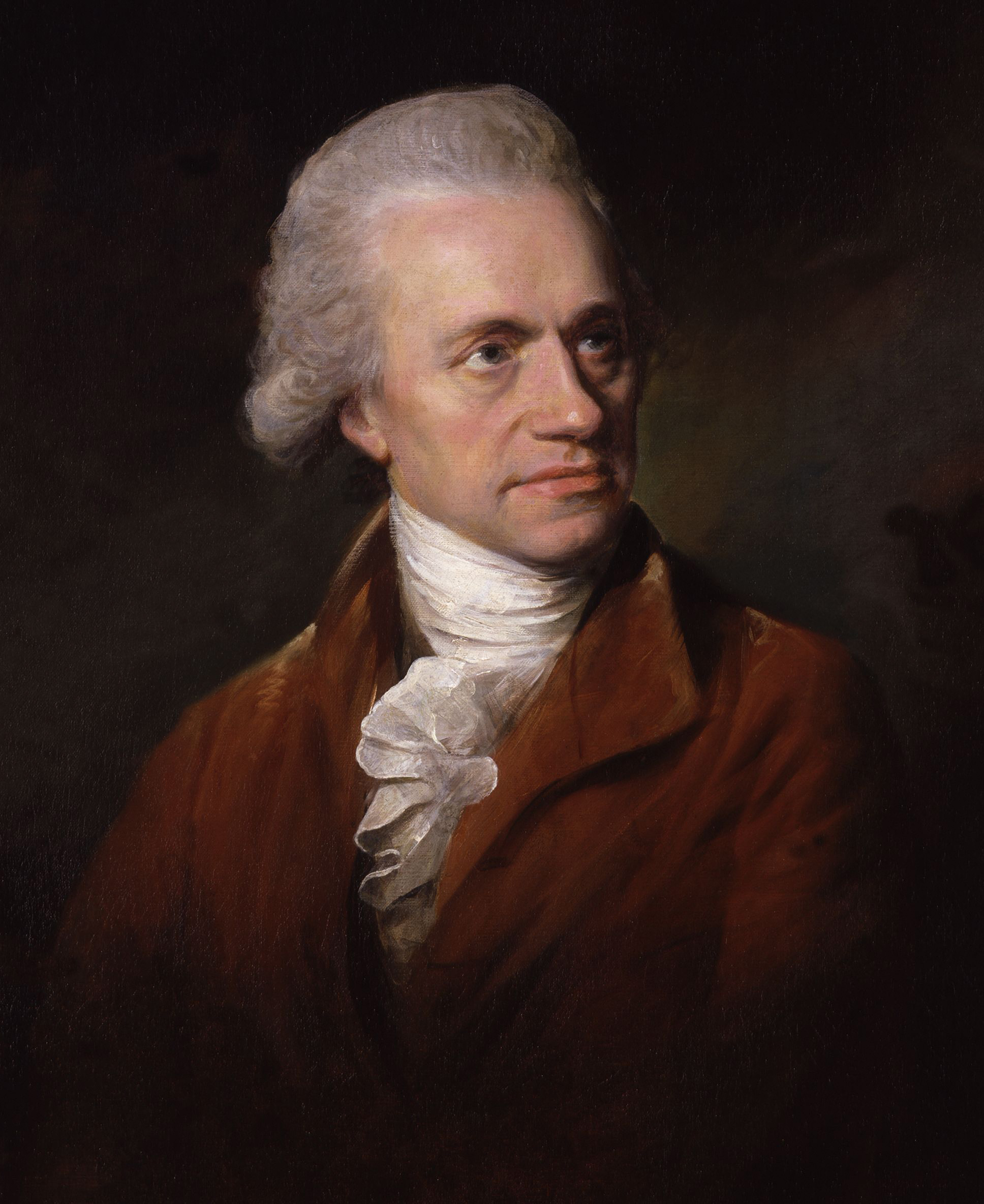
William Herschel, discoverer of Enceladus

Enceladus was discovered by William Herschel on August 28, 1789, during the first use of his new 1.2 m (47 in) 40-foot telescope, then the largest in the world, at Observatory House in Slough, England. Its faint apparent magnitude (H_{V} = +11.7) and its proximity to the much brighter Saturn and Saturn's rings make Enceladus difficult to observe from Earth with smaller telescopes. Like many satellites of Saturn discovered prior to the Space Age, Enceladus was first observed during a Saturnian equinox, when Earth is within the ring plane. At such times, the reduction in glare from the rings makes the moons easier to observe. Prior to the Voyager missions the view of Enceladus improved little from the dot first observed by Herschel. Only its orbital characteristics were known, with estimations of its mass, density and albedo.

=== Naming ===
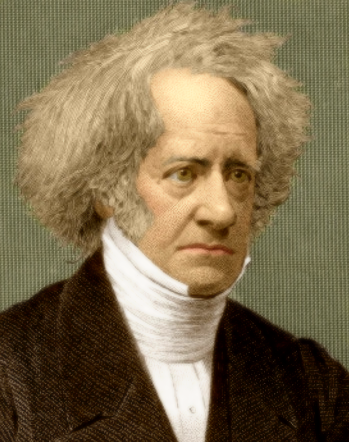
John Herschel, the astronomer who suggested that the moons of Saturn be named after the Titans and Giants

Enceladus is named after the giant Enceladus of Greek mythology. The name, like the names of each of the first seven satellites of Saturn to be discovered, was suggested by William Herschel's son John Herschel in his 1847 publication Results of Astronomical Observations made at the Cape of Good Hope. He chose these names because Saturn, known in Greek mythology as Cronus, was the leader of the Titans.

Geological features on Enceladus are named by the International Astronomical Union (IAU) after characters and places from Richard Francis Burton's 1885 translation of The Book of One Thousand and One Nights. Impact craters are named after characters, whereas other feature types, such as fossae (long, narrow depressions), dorsa (ridges), planitiae (plains), sulci (long parallel grooves), and rupes (cliffs) are named after places. The IAU has officially named 85 features on Enceladus, most recently Samaria Rupes, formerly called Samaria Fossa.

Planetary moons other than Earth's were never given symbols in the astronomical literature. Denis Moskowitz, a software engineer who designed most of the dwarf planet symbols, proposed a Greek epsilon (the initial of Enceladus) combined with the crook of the Saturn symbol as the symbol of Enceladus. This symbol is not widely used.

== Orbit and rotation ==
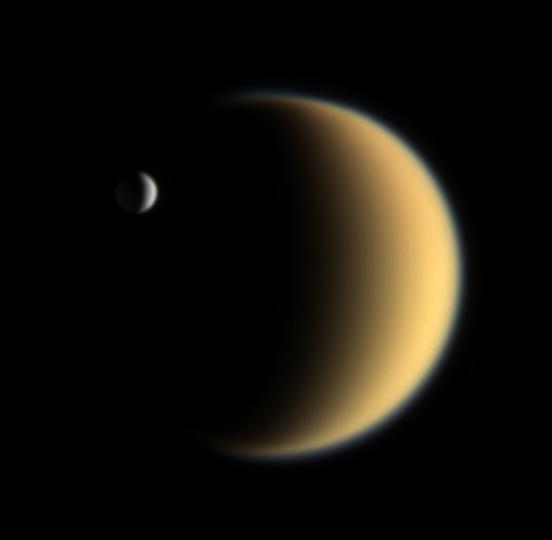
Enceladus is Saturn's second smallest major moon. It is about one-tenth the diameter of Titan, Saturn's largest moon.

Enceladus is the second major moon from Saturn. It orbits at 238,000 km (148,000 mi) from Saturn's center and 180,000 km (110,000 mi) from its cloud tops, between the orbits of Mimas and Tethys. It orbits Saturn every 32.9 hours, fast enough for its motion to be observed over a single night of observation.

Enceladus is currently in a 2:1 mean-motion orbital resonance with Dione, completing two orbits around Saturn for every one orbit completed by Dione. This resonance maintains Enceladus's orbital eccentricity (0.0047), which is known as a forced eccentricity. This non-zero eccentricity results in tidal deformation of Enceladus. The dissipated heat resulting from this deformation is the main heating source for Enceladus's geologic activity.

Enceladus orbits within the densest part of Saturn's E ring, the outermost of its major rings, and is the main source of the ring's material composition.

Like most of Saturn's larger satellites, Enceladus rotates synchronously with its orbital period, keeping one face pointed toward Saturn. Unlike Earth's Moon, Enceladus does not appear to librate more than 1.5° about its spin axis. However, analysis of the shape of Enceladus suggests that at some point it was in a 1:4 forced secondary spin–orbit libration. This libration could have provided Enceladus with an additional heat source.

=== Source of the E ring ===
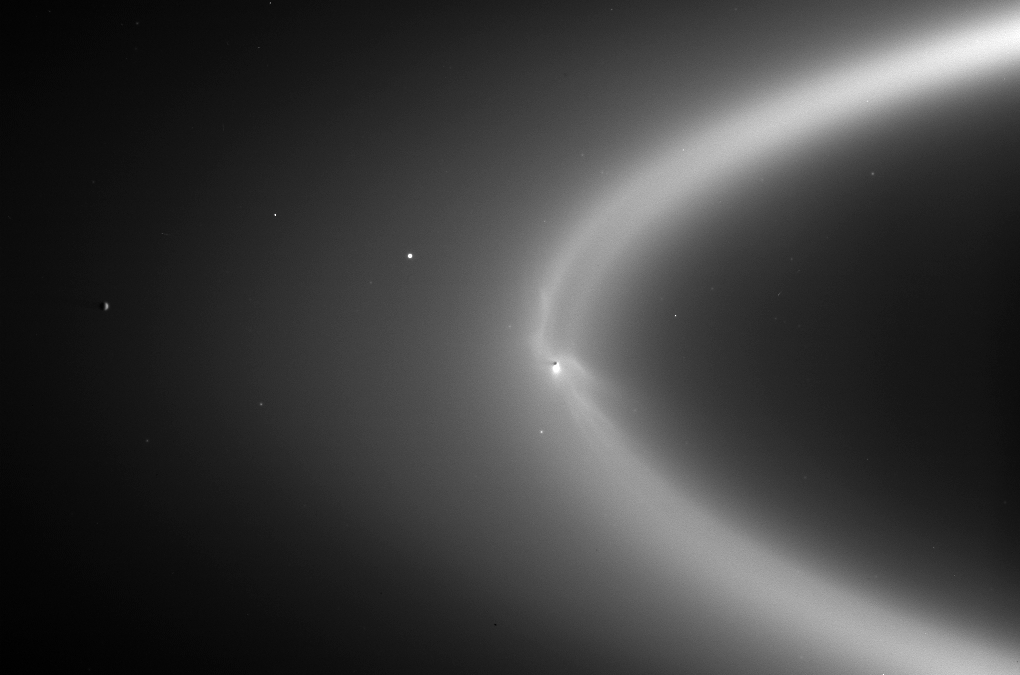
Enceladus orbiting within Saturn's E ring

Plumes from Enceladus, which are similar in composition to comets, have been shown to be the source of the material in Saturn's E ring. The E ring is the widest and outermost ring of Saturn (except for the tenuous Phoebe ring). It is an extremely wide but diffuse disk of microscopic icy or dusty material distributed between the orbits of Mimas and Titan.

Mathematical models show that the E ring is unstable, with a lifespan between 10,000 and 1 million years; therefore, particles composing it must be constantly replenished. Enceladus is orbiting inside the ring, at its narrowest but highest density point. In the 1980s, some astronomers suspected that Enceladus is the main source of particles for the ring. This hypothesis was confirmed by Cassini's first two close flybys in 2005.

The Cosmic Dust Analyzer (CDA) "detected a large increase in the number of particles near Enceladus", confirming it as the primary source for the E ring. Analysis of the CDA and INMS data suggest that the gas cloud Cassini flew through during the July encounter, and observed from a distance with its magnetometer and UVIS, was actually a water-rich cryovolcanic plume, originating from vents near the south pole.

Visual confirmation of venting came in November 2005, when Cassini imaged geyser-like jets of icy particles rising from Enceladus's south polar region. (Although the plume was imaged before, in January and February 2005, additional studies of the camera's response at high phase angles, when the Sun is almost behind Enceladus, and comparison with equivalent high-phase-angle images taken of other Saturnian satellites, were required before this could be confirmed.)

== Physical characteristics ==
=== Shape and size ===
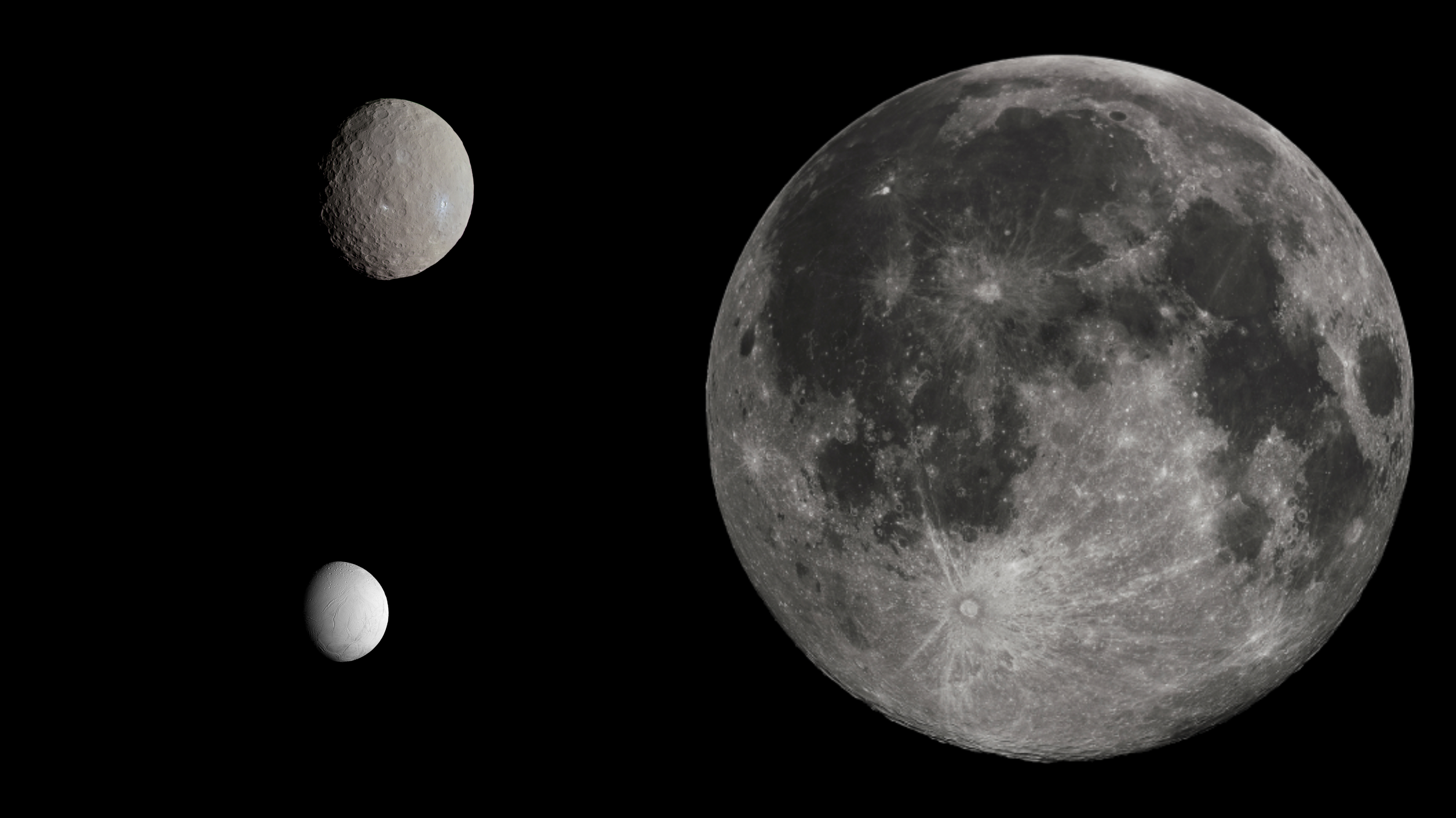
Enceladus (lower left) compared to 1 Ceres and the Moon

Enceladus is a relatively small satellite composed of ice and rock. It is a scalene ellipsoid in shape; its diameters, calculated from images taken by Cassini's ISS (Imaging Science Subsystem) instrument, are 513 km between the sub- and anti-Saturnian poles, 503 km between the leading and trailing hemispheres, and 497 km between the north and south poles.

Enceladus is only one-seventh the diameter of Earth's Moon. It ranks sixth in both mass and size among the satellites of Saturn, after Titan (5,150 km), Rhea (1,530 km), Iapetus (1,440 km), Dione (1,120 km) and Tethys (1,050 km).

=== Internal structure ===
Before the Cassini mission, little was known about the interior of Enceladus. However, flybys by Cassini provided information for models of Enceladus's interior, including a better determination of the mass and shape, high-resolution observations of the surface, and new insights on the interior.

Initial mass estimates from the Voyager program missions suggested that Enceladus was composed almost entirely of water ice. However, based on the effects of Enceladus's gravity on Cassini, its mass was determined to be much higher than previously thought, yielding a density of 1.61 g/cm^{3}. This density is higher than those of Saturn's other mid-sized icy satellites, indicating that Enceladus contains a greater percentage of silicates and iron.

Castillo, Matson et al. (2005) suggested that Iapetus and the other icy satellites of Saturn formed relatively quickly after the formation of the Saturnian subnebula, and thus were rich in short-lived radionuclides. These radionuclides, like aluminium-26 and iron-60, have short half-lives and would produce interior heating relatively quickly. Without the short-lived variety, Enceladus's complement of long-lived radionuclides would not have been enough to prevent rapid freezing of the interior, even with Enceladus's comparatively high rock–mass fraction, given its small size.

Given Enceladus's relatively high rock–mass fraction, the proposed enhancement in ^{26}Al and ^{60}Fe would result in a differentiated body, with an icy mantle and a rocky core. Subsequent radioactive and tidal heating would raise the temperature of the core to 1,000 K, enough to melt the inner mantle. For Enceladus to still be active, part of the core must have also melted, forming magma chambers that would flex under the strain of Saturn's tides. Tidal heating, such as from the resonance with Dione or from libration, would then have sustained these hot spots in the core and would power the current geological activity.

In addition to its mass and modelled geochemistry, researchers have also examined Enceladus's shape to determine if it is differentiated. Porco, Helfenstein et al. (2006) used limb measurements to determine that its shape, assuming hydrostatic equilibrium, is consistent with an undifferentiated interior, in contradiction to the geological and geochemical evidence. However, the current shape also supports the possibility that Enceladus is not in hydrostatic equilibrium, and may have rotated faster at some point in the recent past (with a differentiated interior). Gravity measurements by Cassini show that the density of the core is low, indicating that the core contains water in addition to silicates.

==== Subsurface ocean ====
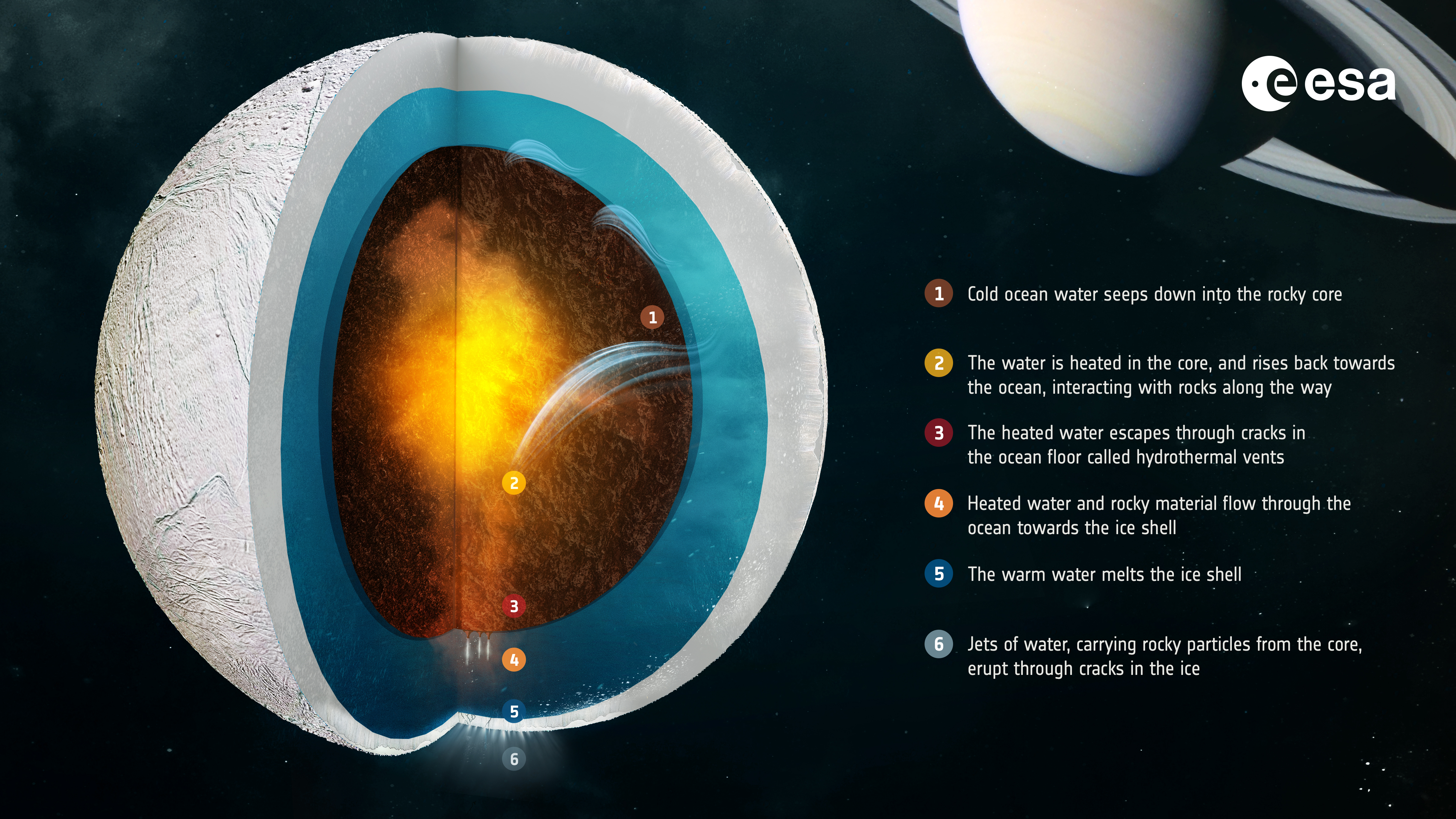
An artist's impression of Enceladus' internal structure and of the global subsurface ocean of liquid water

Evidence of liquid water on Enceladus began to accumulate in 2005, when scientists observed plumes containing water vapour spewing from its south polar surface, with jets moving 250 kg of water vapour every second at up to 2,189 km/h (1,360 mph) into space. Soon after, in 2006 it was determined that Enceladus's plumes are the source of Saturn's E Ring. The sources of salty particles are uniformly distributed along the tiger stripes, whereas sources of "fresh" particles are closely related to the high-speed gas jets. The "salty" particles are heavier and mostly fall back to the surface, whereas the fast "fresh" particles escape to the E ring, explaining its salt-poor composition of 0.5–2% of sodium salts by mass.

Gravimetric data from Cassini's December 2010 flybys showed that Enceladus likely has a liquid water ocean beneath its frozen surface, but at the time it was thought the subsurface ocean was limited to the south pole. The top of the ocean probably lies beneath a 30-to-40-kilometre-thick (19 to 25 mi) ice shelf. The ocean may be 10 km (6.2 mi) deep at the south pole.

Measurements of Enceladus's "wobble" as it orbits Saturn—called libration—suggests that the entire icy crust is detached from the rocky core and therefore that a global ocean is present beneath the surface. The amount of libration (0.120° ± 0.014°) implies that this global ocean is about 26 to 31 kilometres (16 to 19 miles) deep. For comparison, Earth's ocean has an average depth of 3.7 kilometres.

===== Composition =====
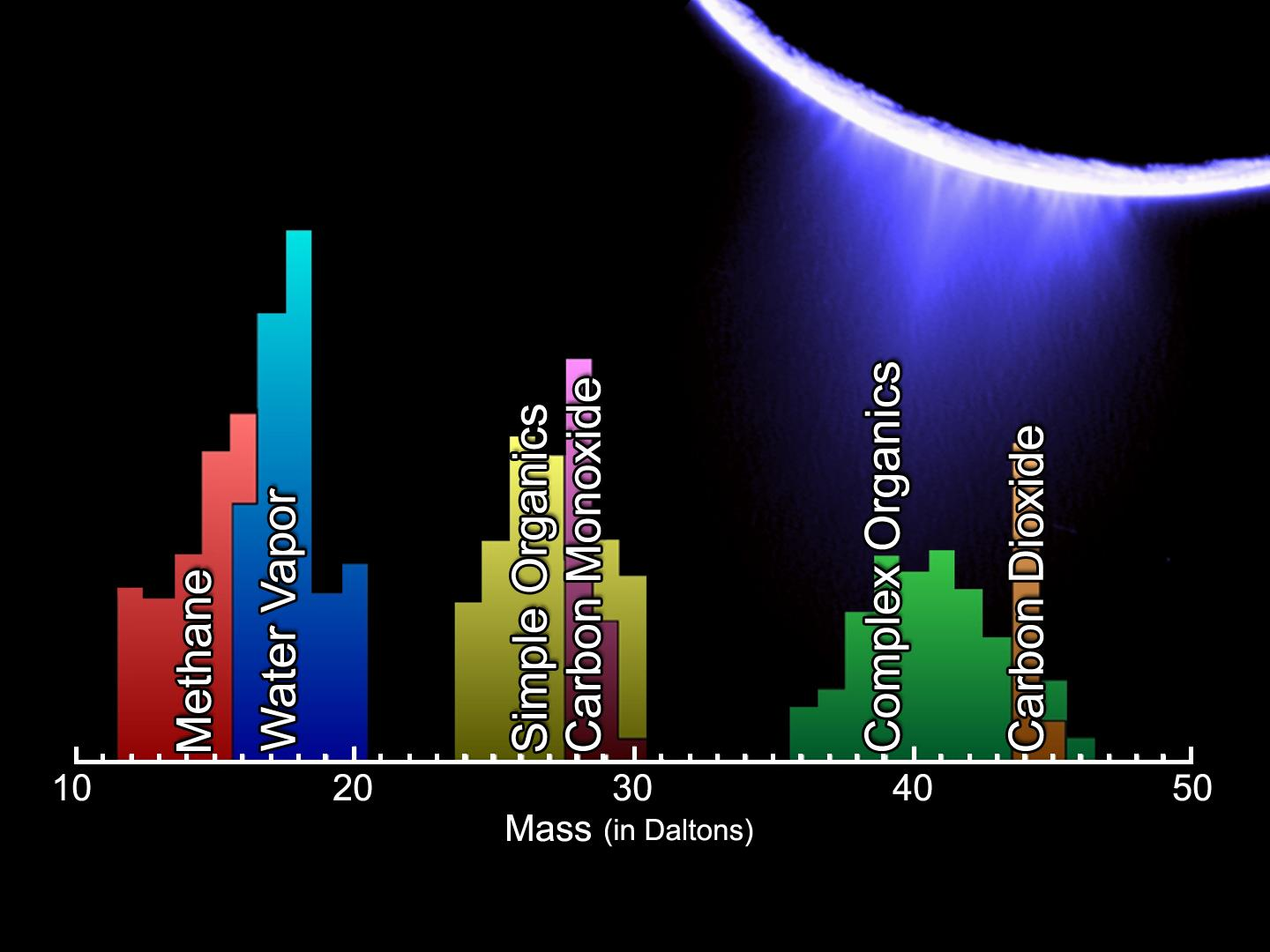
The chemical composition of Enceladus's plumes

The Cassini spacecraft flew through the southern plumes on several occasions to sample and analyse their composition. The plumes' salty composition (-Na, -Cl, -CO_{3}) indicates that the source is a salty subsurface ocean.

The INMS instrument detected mostly water vapour, as well as traces of molecular nitrogen, carbon dioxide, and trace amounts of simple hydrocarbons such as methane, propane, acetylene and formaldehyde. The plumes' composition, as measured by the INMS, is similar to that seen at most comets. Cassini also found traces of simple organic compounds in some dust grains, as well as larger organics such as benzene (C_{6}H_{6}), and complex macromolecular organics as large as 200 atomic mass units, and at least 15 carbon atoms in size.

The mass spectrometer detected molecular hydrogen (H_{2}) which was in "thermodynamic disequilibrium" with the other components, and found traces of ammonia (NH_{3}).

A model suggests that Enceladus's salty ocean (-Na, -Cl, -CO_{3}) has an alkaline pH of 11 to 12. The high pH is interpreted to be a consequence of serpentinization of chondritic rock that leads to the generation of H_{2}, a geochemical source of energy that could support both abiotic and biological synthesis of organic molecules such as those that have been detected in Enceladus's plumes.

Further analysis in 2019 was done of the spectral characteristics of ice grains in Enceladus's erupting plumes. The study found that nitrogen-bearing and oxygen-bearing amines were likely present, with significant implications for the availability of amino acids in the internal ocean. The researchers suggested that the compounds on Enceladus could be precursors for "biologically relevant organic compounds".

A 2025 paper reported the detection of organic molecules in plume samples taken by the Cosmic Dust Analyzer.

=== Possible heat sources ===
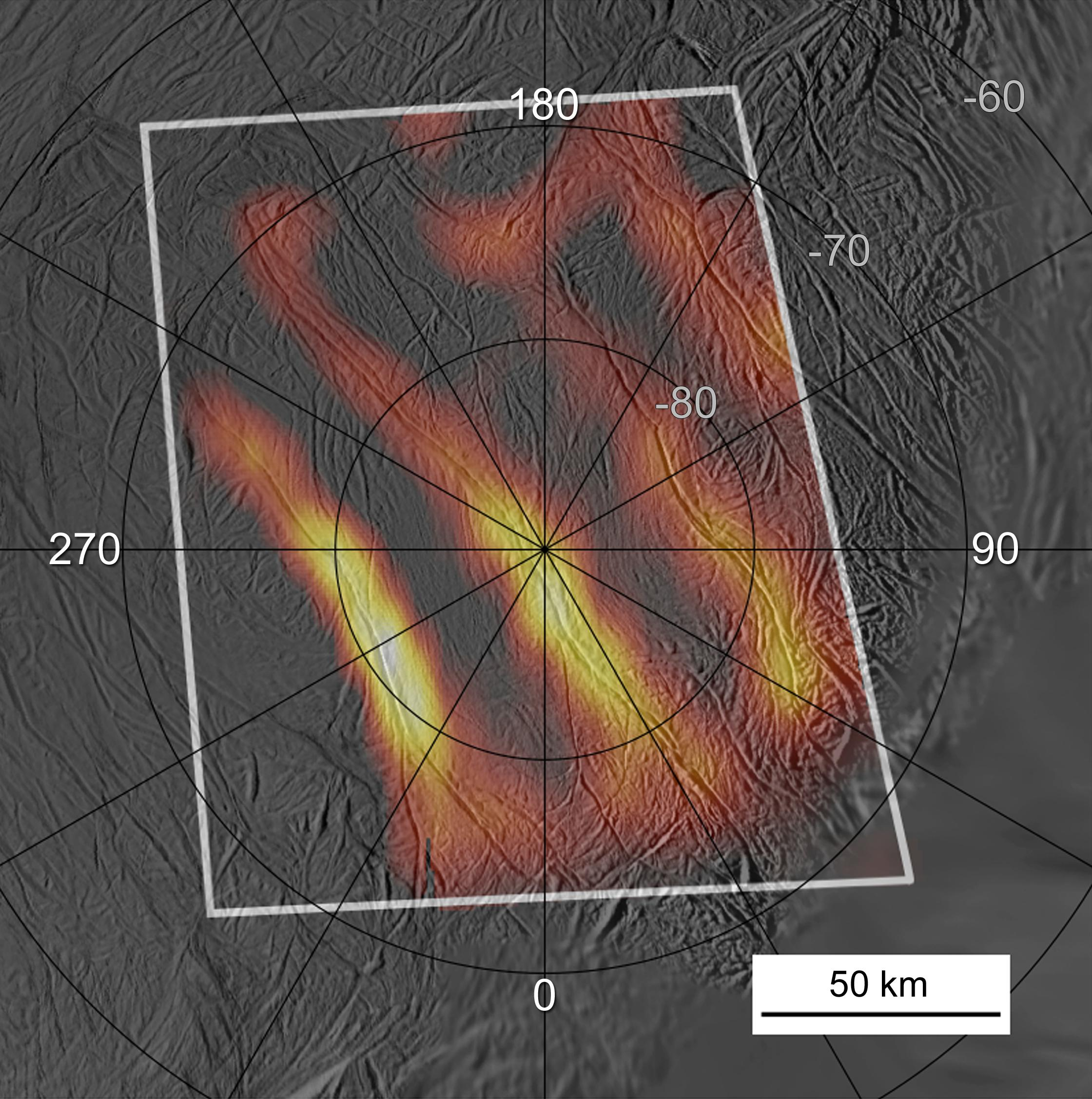
Heat map of the south polar fractures, dubbed 'tiger stripes'

During the flyby of July 14, 2005, the Composite Infrared Spectrometer (CIRS) found a warm region near the south pole. Temperatures in this region ranged from 85 to 90 K, with small areas showing as high as 157 K (−116 °C), much too warm to be explained by solar heating, indicating that parts of the south polar region are heated from the interior of Enceladus. The presence of a subsurface ocean under the south polar region is now accepted, but it cannot explain the source of the heat, with an estimated heat flux of 200 mW/m^{2}, which is about 10 times higher than that from radiogenic heating alone.

Several explanations for the observed elevated temperatures and the resulting plumes have been proposed, including venting from a subsurface reservoir of liquid water, sublimation of ice, decompression and dissociation of clathrates, and shear heating, but a complete explanation of all the heat sources causing the observed thermal power output of Enceladus has not yet been settled.

Heating in Enceladus has occurred through various mechanisms ever since its formation. Radioactive decay in its core may have initially heated it, giving it a warm core and a subsurface ocean, which is now kept above freezing through unidentified mechanisms. Geophysical models indicate that tidal heating is a main heat source, perhaps aided by radioactive decay and some heat-producing chemical reactions. A 2007 study predicted the internal heat of Enceladus, if generated by tidal forces, could be no greater than 1.1 gigawatts, but data from Cassini's infrared spectrometer of the south polar terrain over 16 months, indicate that the internal heat generated power is about 4.7 gigawatts, and suggest that it is in thermal equilibrium.

The observed power output of 4.7 gigawatts is challenging to explain from tidal heating alone, so the main source of heat remains a mystery. Most scientists think the observed heat flux of Enceladus is not enough to maintain the subsurface ocean, and therefore any subsurface ocean must be a remnant of a period of higher eccentricity and tidal heating, or the heat is produced through another mechanism.

==== Tidal heating ====
Tidal heating occurs through the tidal friction processes: orbital and rotational energy are dissipated as heat in the crust of an object. In addition, to the extent that tides produce heat along fractures, libration may affect the magnitude and distribution of such tidal shear heating. Tidal dissipation of Enceladus's ice crust is significant because Enceladus has a subsurface ocean. A computer simulation that used data from Cassini was published in November 2017, and it indicates that friction heat from the sliding rock fragments within the permeable and fragmented core of Enceladus could keep its underground ocean warm for up to billions of years. It is thought that if Enceladus had a more eccentric orbit in the past, the enhanced tidal forces could be sufficient to maintain a subsurface ocean, such that a periodic enhancement in eccentricity could maintain a subsurface ocean that periodically changes in size.

A 2016 analysis claimed that "a model of the tiger stripes as tidally flexed slots that puncture the ice shell can simultaneously explain the persistence of the eruptions through the tidal cycle, the phase lag, and the total power output of the tiger stripe terrain, while suggesting that eruptions are maintained over geological timescales." Previous models suggest that resonant perturbations of Dione could provide the necessary periodic eccentricity changes to maintain the subsurface ocean of Enceladus, if the ocean contains a substantial amount of ammonia. The surface of Enceladus indicates that the entire moon has experienced periods of enhanced heat flux in the past.

==== Radioactive heating ====
The present-day radiogenic heating rate is 3.2 × 10^{15} ergs/s (or 0.32 gigawatts), assuming Enceladus has a composition of ice, iron and silicate materials. Heating from long-lived radioactive isotopes uranium-238, uranium-235, thorium-232 and potassium-40 inside Enceladus would add 0.3 gigawatts to the observed heat flux. The presence of Enceladus's regionally thick subsurface ocean suggests a heat flux ≈10 times higher than that from radiogenic heating in the silicate core.

The exotic "hot start" hypothesis posits that Enceladus began as ice and rock that contained rapidly decaying short-lived radioactive isotopes of aluminium, iron and manganese. Enormous amounts of heat were then produced as these isotopes decayed for about 7 million years, resulting in the consolidation of rocky material at the core surrounded by a shell of ice. Although the heat from radioactivity would decrease over time, the combination of radioactivity and tidal forces from Saturn's gravitational tug could prevent the subsurface ocean from freezing.

==== Chemical factors ====
Because no ammonia was initially found in the vented material by INMS or UVIS, which could act as an antifreeze, it was thought such a heated, pressurized chamber would consist of nearly pure liquid water with a temperature of at least 270 K (−3 °C), because pure water requires more energy to melt.

In July 2009 it was announced that traces of ammonia had been found in the plumes during flybys in July and October 2008. Reducing the freezing point of water with ammonia would also allow for outgassing and higher gas pressure, and less heat required to power the water plumes. The subsurface layer heating the surface water ice could be an ammonia–water slurry at temperatures as low as 170 K (−103 °C), and thus less energy is required to produce the plume activity. However, the observed 4.7 gigawatts heat flux is enough to power the cryovolcanism without the presence of ammonia.

== Surface features ==
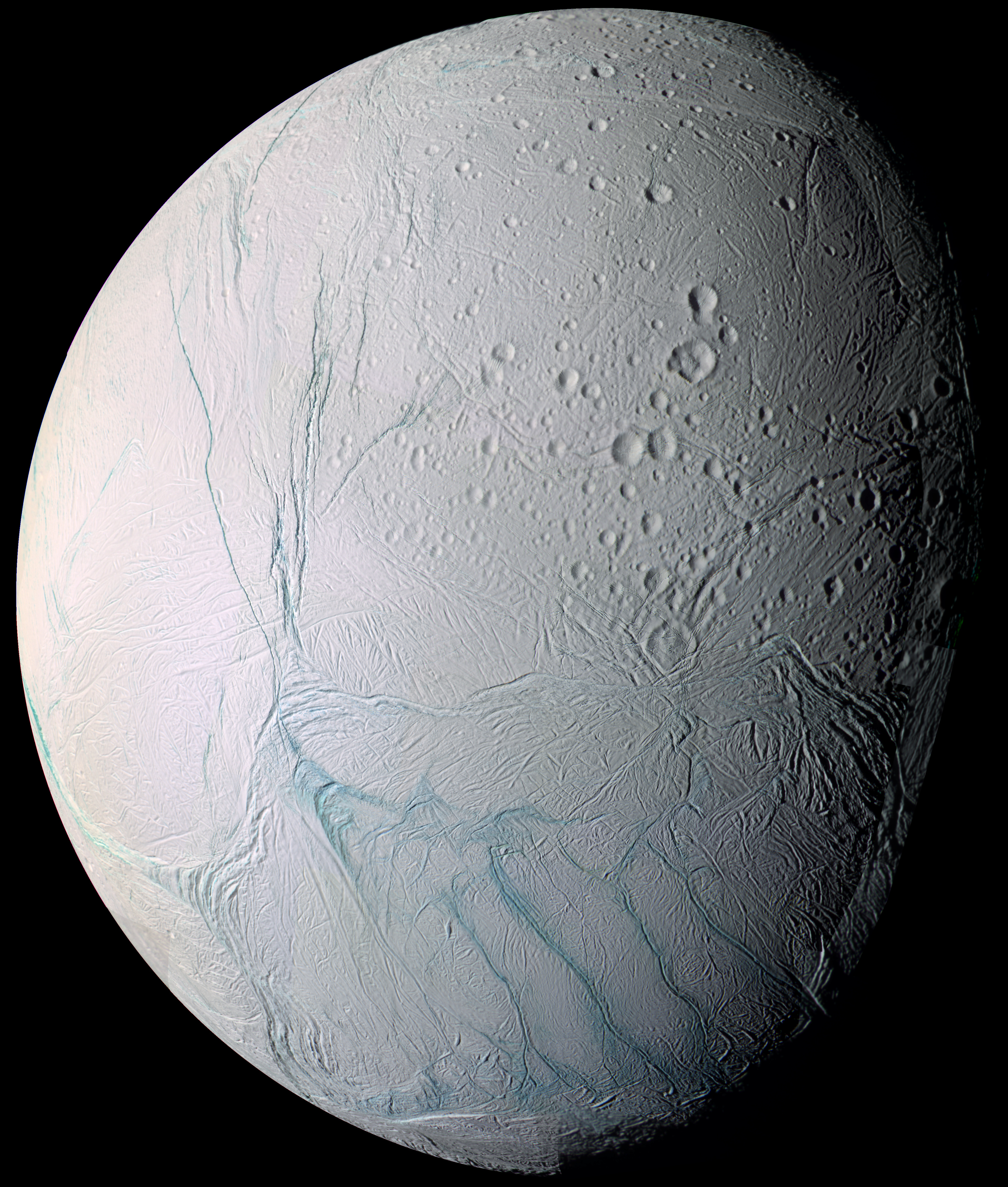
A false-color photo mosaic of Enceladus, highlighting its ridges, impact craters and plains

Voyager 2 was the first spacecraft to observe Enceladus's surface in detail, in August 1981. Examination of the resulting highest-resolution imagery revealed at least five different types of terrain, including several regions of cratered terrain, regions of smooth (young) terrain, and lanes of ridged terrain often bordering the smooth areas. Extensive linear cracks and scarps were observed. Given the relative lack of craters on the smooth plains, these regions are probably less than a few hundred million years old.

Accordingly, Enceladus must have been recently active with "water volcanism" or other processes that renew the surface. The fresh, clean ice that dominates its surface makes Enceladus the most reflective body in the Solar System, with a visual geometric albedo of 1.38 and bolometric Bond albedo of 0.76±0.03. Because it reflects so much sunlight, its surface only reaches a mean noon temperature of −198 °C (−324 °F), somewhat colder than other Saturnian satellites.

Observations during three flybys on February 17, March 9, and July 14, 2005, revealed Enceladus's surface features in much greater detail than the Voyager 2 observations. The smooth plains, which Voyager 2 had observed, resolved into relatively crater-free regions filled with numerous small ridges and scarps. Numerous fractures were found within the older, cratered terrain, suggesting that the surface has been subjected to extensive deformation since the craters were formed.

Some areas contain no craters, indicating major resurfacing events in the geologically recent past. There are fissures, plains, corrugated terrain and other crustal deformations. Several additional regions of young terrain were discovered in areas not well imaged by either Voyager spacecraft, such as the bizarre terrain near the south pole. All of this indicates that Enceladus's interior is liquid today, even though it should have been frozen long ago.

=== Snow ===
The Enceladean surface is covered in snow deposited by its geysers. It is several hundred metres in depth in most places, up to an estimated 700 meters at its thickest. Its depth can be estimated by how it sinks into fissures in the surface. In order for it to be as thick as it is, without being more compacted than it is, the geysers must have recently been more active than they are now.

=== Impact craters ===
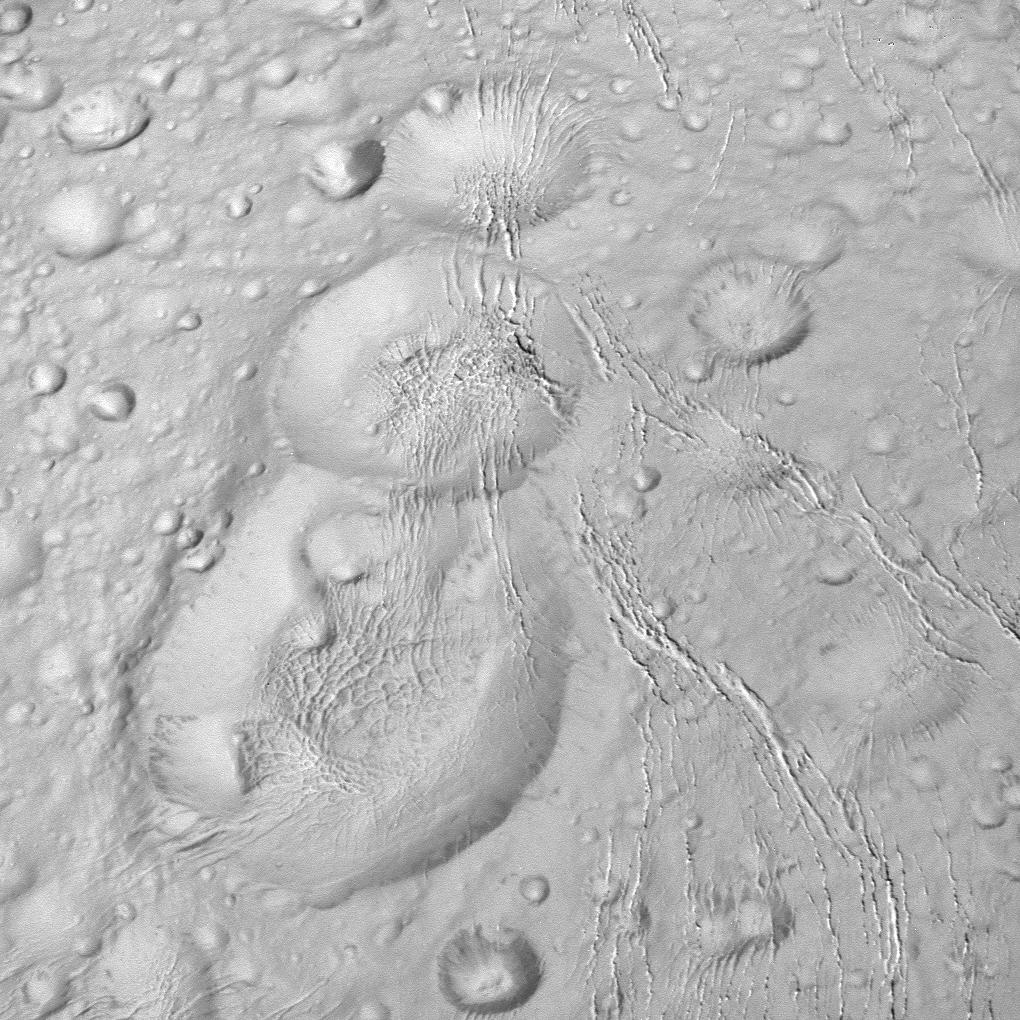
A close-up picture of Al-Haddar (top), Shahrazad (middle) and Dunyazad (bottom) craters

Impact cratering is a common occurrence on many Solar System bodies. Much of Enceladus's surface is covered with craters at various densities and levels of degradation. This subdivision of cratered terrains on the basis of crater density (and thus surface age) suggests that Enceladus has been resurfaced in multiple stages.

Cassini observations provided a much closer look at the crater distribution and size, showing that many of Enceladus's craters are heavily degraded through viscous relaxation and fracturing. Viscous relaxation allows gravity, over geologic time scales, to deform craters and other topographic features formed in water ice, reducing the amount of topography over time. The rate at which this occurs is dependent on the temperature of the ice: warmer ice is easier to deform than colder, stiffer ice. Viscously relaxed craters tend to have domed floors, or are recognized as craters only by a raised, circular rim. Dunyazad crater is a prime example of a viscously relaxed crater on Enceladus, with a prominent domed floor.

=== Tectonic features ===
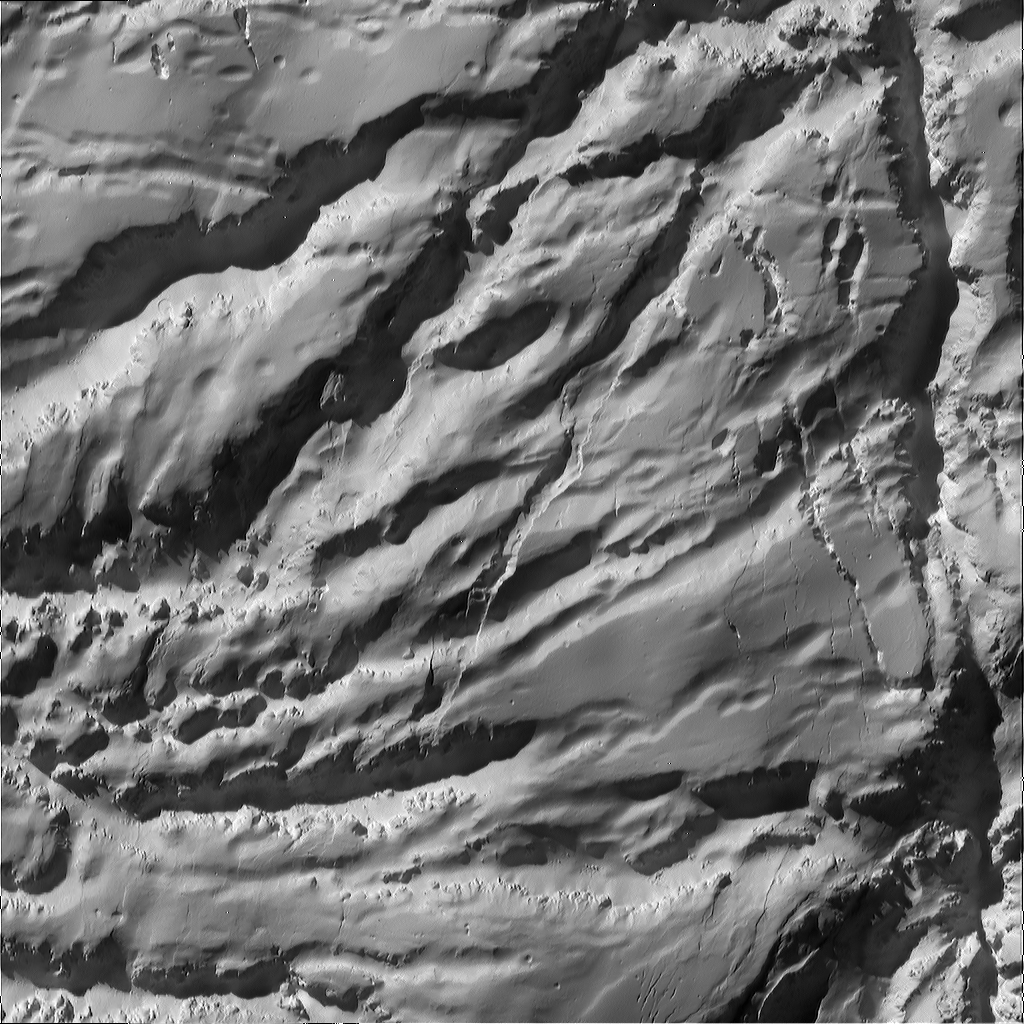
A close-up view of Enceladus's ridges

Voyager 2 found several types of tectonic features on Enceladus, including troughs, scarps, and belts of grooves and ridges. Results from Cassini suggest that tectonics is the dominant mode of deformation on Enceladus, including rifts, one of the more dramatic types of tectonic features that were noted. These canyons can be up to 200 km long, 5–10 km wide, and 1 km deep. Such features are geologically young, because they cut across other tectonic features and have sharp topographic relief with prominent outcrops along the cliff faces.

Evidence of tectonics on Enceladus is also derived from grooved terrain, consisting of lanes of curvilinear grooves and ridges. These bands, first discovered by Voyager 2, often separate smooth plains from cratered regions. Grooved terrains such as the Samarkand Sulci are reminiscent of grooved terrain on Ganymede. Unlike those seen on Ganymede, grooved topography on Enceladus is generally more complex. Rather than parallel sets of grooves, these lanes often appear as bands of crudely aligned, chevron-shaped features.

In other areas, these bands bow upwards with fractures and ridges running the length of the feature. Cassini observations of the Samarkand Sulci have revealed dark spots (125 and 750 m wide) located parallel to the narrow fractures. Currently, these spots are interpreted as collapse pits within these ridged plain belts.

In addition to deep fractures and grooved lanes, Enceladus has several other types of tectonic terrain. Many of these fractures are found in bands cutting across cratered terrain. These fractures probably propagate down only a few hundred metres into the crust. Many have probably been influenced during their formation by the weakened regolith produced by impact craters, often changing the strike of the propagating fracture.

Another example of tectonic features on Enceladus are the linear grooves first found by Voyager 2 and seen at a much higher resolution by Cassini. These linear grooves can be seen cutting across other terrain types, like the groove and ridge belts. Like the deep rifts, they are among the youngest features on Enceladus. However, some linear grooves have been softened like the craters nearby, suggesting that they are older. Ridges have also been observed on Enceladus, though not nearly to the extent as those seen on Europa. These ridges are relatively limited in extent and are up to one kilometre tall. One-kilometer high domes have also been observed. Given the level of resurfacing found on Enceladus, it is clear that tectonic movement has been an important driver of geology for much of its history.

=== Smooth plains ===
Two regions of smooth plains were observed by Voyager 2. They generally have low relief and have far fewer craters than in the cratered terrains, indicating a relatively young surface age. In one of the smooth plain regions, Sarandib Planitia, no impact craters were visible down to the limit of resolution. Another region of smooth plains to the southwest of Sarandib is criss-crossed by several troughs and scarps. Cassini has since viewed these smooth plains regions, like Sarandib Planitia and Diyar Planitia at much higher resolution. Cassini images show these regions filled with low-relief ridges and fractures, probably caused by shear deformation. The high-resolution images of Sarandib Planitia revealed a number of small impact craters, which allow for an estimate of the surface age, either 170 million years or 3.7 billion years, depending on assumed impactor population. (Note: Without samples to provide absolute age determinations, crater counting is currently the only method for determining surface age on most planetary surfaces. Unfortunately, there is currently disagreement in the scientific community regarding the flux of impactors in the outer Solar System. These competing models can significantly alter the age estimate even with the same crater counts. For the sake of completeness, both age estimates from Porco, Helfenstein et al. (2006) are provided.)

The expanded surface coverage provided by Cassini has allowed for the identification of additional regions of smooth plains, particularly on Enceladus's leading hemisphere (the side of Enceladus that faces the direction of motion as it orbits Saturn). Rather than being covered in low-relief ridges, this region is covered in numerous criss-crossing sets of troughs and ridges, similar to the deformation seen in the south polar region. This area is on the opposite side of Enceladus from Sarandib and Diyar Planitiae, suggesting that the placement of these regions is influenced by Saturn's tides on Enceladus.

=== South polar region ===
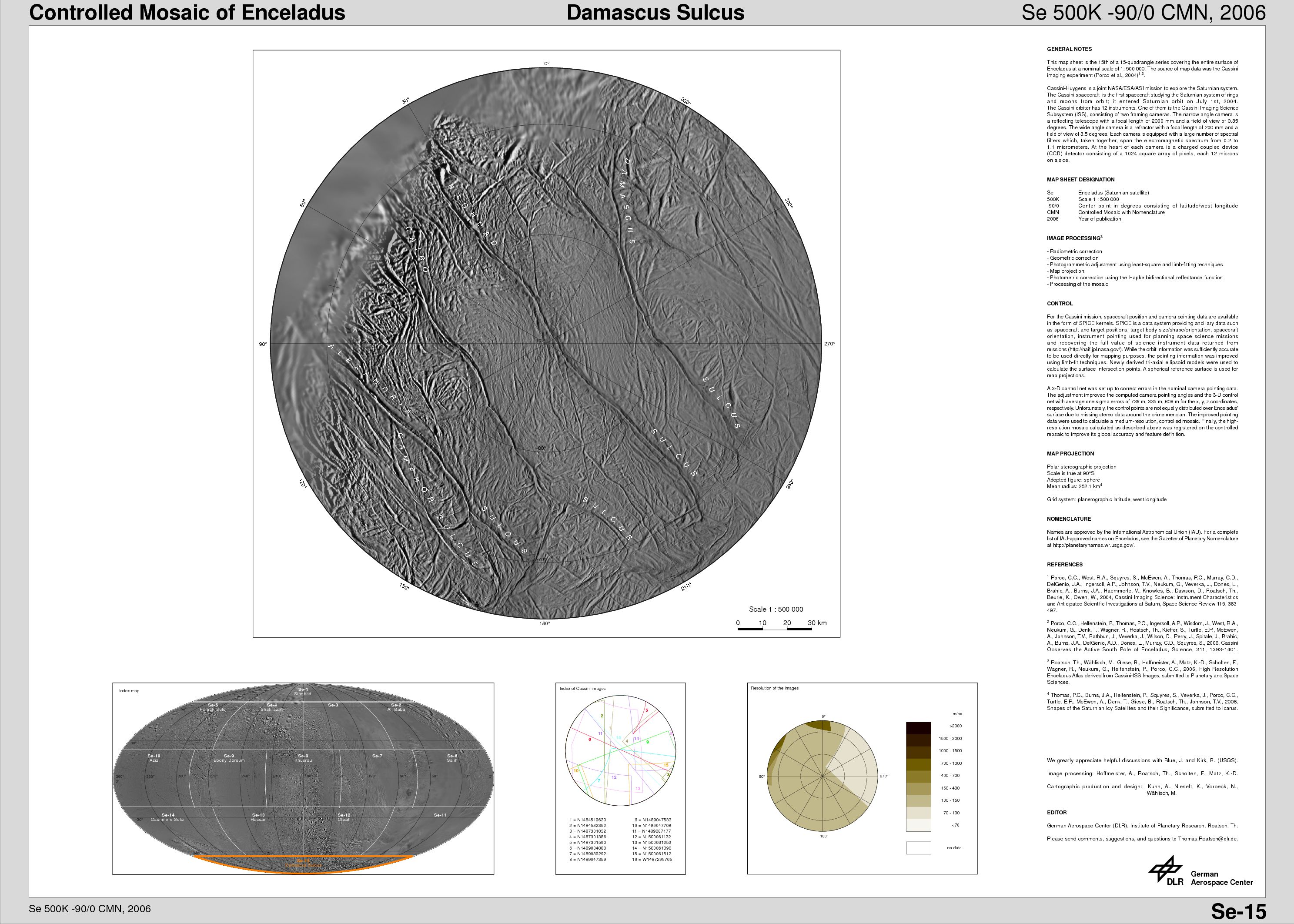
An atlas of Enceladus's south pole quadrangle, which is dominated by the tiger stripes

Images taken by Cassini during the flyby on July 14, 2005, revealed a distinctive, tectonically deformed region surrounding Enceladus's south pole. This area, reaching as far north as 60° south latitude, is covered in tectonic fractures and ridges. The area has few sizeable impact craters, suggesting that it is the youngest surface on Enceladus and on any of the mid-sized icy satellites. Modelling of the cratering rate suggests that some regions of the south polar terrain are possibly as young as 500,000 years or less.

Near the center of this terrain are four fractures bounded by ridges, unofficially called "tiger stripes". They appear to be the youngest features in this region and are surrounded by mint-green-colored (in false colour, UV–green–near IR images), coarse-grained water ice, seen elsewhere on the surface within outcrops and fracture walls. Here the "blue" ice is on a flat surface, indicating that the region is young enough not to have been coated by fine-grained water ice from the E ring.

Results from the visual and infrared mapping spectrometer (VIMS) instrument suggest that the green-coloured material surrounding the tiger stripes is chemically distinct from the rest of the surface of Enceladus. VIMS detected crystalline water ice in the stripes, suggesting that they are quite young (likely less than 1,000 years old) or the surface ice has been thermally altered in the recent past. VIMS also detected simple organic (carbon-containing) compounds in the tiger stripes, chemistry not found anywhere else on Enceladus thus far.

One of these areas of "blue" ice in the south polar region was observed at high resolution during the July 14, 2005, flyby, revealing an area of extreme tectonic deformation and blocky terrain, with some areas covered in boulders 10–100 m across.

The boundary of the south polar region is marked by a pattern of parallel, Y- and V-shaped ridges and valleys. The shape, orientation, and location of these features suggest they are caused by changes in the overall shape of Enceladus. As of 2006 there were two theories for what could cause such a shift in shape: the orbit of Enceladus may have migrated inward, leading to an increase in Enceladus's rotation rate. Such a shift would lead to a more oblate shape; or a rising mass of warm, low-density material in Enceladus's interior may have led to a shift in the position of the current south polar terrain from Enceladus's southern mid-latitudes to its south pole.

Consequently, the moon's ellipsoid shape would have adjusted to match the new orientation. One problem of the polar flattening hypothesis is that both polar regions should have similar tectonic deformation histories. However, the north polar region is densely cratered, and has a much older surface age than the south pole. Thickness variations in Enceladus's lithosphere is one explanation for this discrepancy. Variations in lithospheric thickness are supported by the correlation between the Y-shaped discontinuities and the V-shaped cusps along the south polar terrain margin and the relative surface age of the adjacent non-south polar terrain regions. The Y-shaped discontinuities, and the north–south trending tension fractures into which they lead, are correlated with younger terrain with presumably thinner lithospheres. The V-shaped cusps are adjacent to older, more heavily cratered terrains.

==== South polar plumes ====
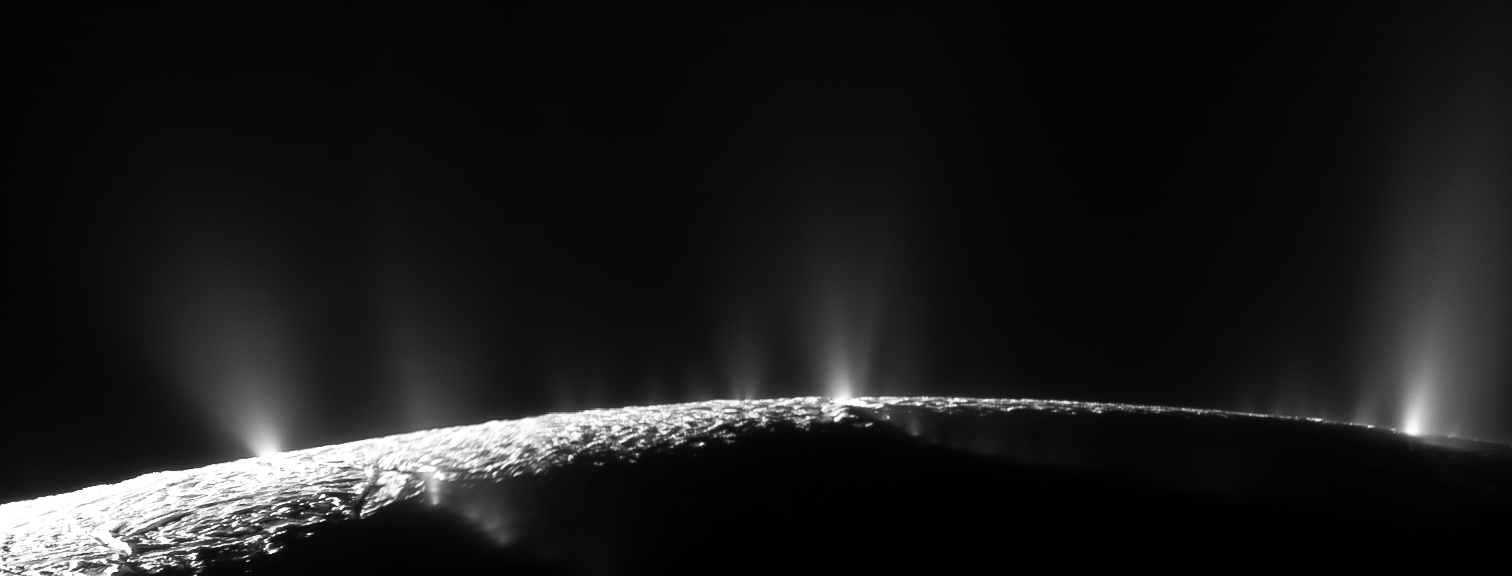
A panorama of Enceladus's plumes taken by the Cassini spacecraft

Following Voyager's encounters with Enceladus in the early 1980s, scientists postulated it to be geologically active based on its young, reflective surface and location near the core of the E ring. Based on the connection between Enceladus and the E ring, scientists suspected that Enceladus was the source of material in the E ring, perhaps through venting of water vapour. The first Cassini sighting of a plume of icy particles above Enceladus's south pole came from the Imaging Science Subsystem (ISS) images taken in January and February 2005, though the possibility of a camera artefact delayed an official announcement.

Data from the magnetometer instrument during the February 17, 2005, encounter provided evidence for a planetary atmosphere. The magnetometer observed a deflection or "draping" of the magnetic field, consistent with local ionization of neutral gas. During the two following encounters, the magnetometer team determined that gases in Enceladus's atmosphere are concentrated over the south polar region, with atmospheric density away from the pole being much lower. Unlike the magnetometer, the Ultraviolet Imaging Spectrograph failed to detect an atmosphere above Enceladus during the February encounter when it looked over the equatorial region, but did detect water vapour during an occultation over the south polar region during the July encounter. Cassini flew through this gas cloud on a few encounters, allowing instruments such as the ion and neutral mass spectrometer (INMS) and the cosmic dust analyser (CDA) to directly sample the plume. (See 'Composition' section.) The November 2005 images showed the plume's fine structure, revealing numerous jets (perhaps issuing from numerous distinct vents) within a larger, faint component extending out nearly 500 km (310 mi) from the surface. The particles have a bulk velocity of 1.25 ± 0.1 kilometres per second (2,800 ± 220 miles per hour), and a maximum velocity of 3.40 km/s (7,600 mph). Cassini's UVIS later observed gas jets coinciding with the dust jets seen by ISS during a non-targeted encounter with Enceladus in October 2007.

The combined analysis of imaging, mass spectrometry, and magnetospheric data suggests that the observed south polar plume emanates from pressurized subsurface chambers, similar to Earth's geysers or fumaroles. Fumaroles are probably the closer analogy, since periodic or episodic emission is an inherent property of geysers. The plumes of Enceladus were observed to be continuous to within a factor of a few. The mechanism that drives and sustains the eruptions is thought to be tidal heating.

The intensity of the eruption of the south polar jets varies significantly as a function of the position of Enceladus in its orbit. The plumes are about four times brighter when Enceladus is at apoapsis (the point in its orbit most distant from Saturn) than when it is at periapsis. This is consistent with geophysical calculations which predict the south polar fissures are under compression near periapsis, pushing them shut, and under tension near apoapsis, pulling them open. Strike-slip tectonics may also drive localized extension along alternating (left- and right- lateral) transtensional zones (e.g., pull-apart basins) over the Tiger Stripes, thereby regulating jet activity within these regions.

Much of the plume activity consists of broad curtain-like eruptions. Optical illusions from a combination of viewing direction and local fracture geometry previously made the plumes look like discrete jets.

The extent to which cryovolcanism really occurs is a subject of some debate. At Enceladus, it appears that cryovolcanism occurs because water-filled cracks are periodically exposed to vacuum, the cracks being opened and closed by tidal stresses.

== Origin ==
=== Mimas–Enceladus paradox ===
Mimas, the innermost of the round moons of Saturn and directly interior to Enceladus, is a geologically dead body, even though it should experience stronger tidal forces than Enceladus. This apparent paradox can be explained in part by temperature-dependent properties of water ice (the main constituent of the interiors of Mimas and Enceladus). The tidal heating per unit mass is given by the formula

$$q_{tid}=\frac{63\rho n^{5} r^{4} e^{2}}{38\mu Q},$$

where ρ is the (mass) density of the satellite, n is its mean orbital motion, r is the satellite's radius, e is the orbital eccentricity of the satellite, μ is the shear modulus and Q is the dimensionless dissipation factor. For a same-temperature approximation, the expected value of q_{tid} for Mimas is about 40 times that of Enceladus. However, the material parameters μ and Q are temperature dependent. At high temperatures (close to the melting point), μ and Q are low, so tidal heating is high. Modelling suggests that for Enceladus, both a 'basic' low-energy thermal state with little internal temperature gradient, and an 'excited' high-energy thermal state with a significant temperature gradient, and consequent convection (endogenic geologic activity), once established, would be stable.

For Mimas, only a low-energy state is expected to be stable, despite its being closer to Saturn. So the model predicts a low-internal-temperature state for Mimas (values of μ and Q are high) but a possible higher-temperature state for Enceladus (values of μ and Q are low). Additional historical information is needed to explain how Enceladus first entered the high-energy state (e.g. more radiogenic heating or a more eccentric orbit in the past).

The significantly higher density of Enceladus relative to Mimas (1.61 vs. 1.15 g/cm^{3}), implying a larger content of rock and more radiogenic heating in its early history, has also been cited as an important factor in resolving the Mimas paradox.

It has been suggested that for an icy satellite the size of Mimas or Enceladus to enter an 'excited state' of tidal heating and convection, it would need to enter an orbital resonance before it lost too much of its primordial internal heat. Because Mimas, being smaller, would cool more rapidly than Enceladus, its window of opportunity for initiating orbital resonance-driven convection would have been considerably shorter.

=== Proto-Enceladus hypothesis ===
Enceladus is losing mass at a rate of 200 kg/second. If mass loss at this rate continued for 4.5 Gyr, the satellite would have lost approximately 30% of its initial mass. A similar value is obtained by assuming that the initial densities of Enceladus and Mimas were equal. It suggests that tectonics in the south polar region is probably mainly related to subsidence and associated subduction caused by the process of mass loss.

=== Date of formation ===
In 2016, a study of how the orbits of Saturn's moons should have changed due to tidal effects suggested that all of Saturn's satellites inward of Titan, including Enceladus (whose geologic activity was used to derive the strength of tidal effects on Saturn's satellites), may have formed as little as 100 million years ago. A later study from 2019 estimated that the ocean is around one billion years old.

== Potential habitability ==
Enceladus ejects plumes of salted water laced with grains of silica-rich sand, nitrogen (in ammonia), and organic molecules, including trace amounts of simple hydrocarbons such as methane (CH_{4}), propane (C_{3}H_{8}), acetylene (C_{2}H_{2}) and formaldehyde (CH_{2}O), which are carbon-bearing molecules. This indicates that hydrothermal activity —an energy source— may be at work in Enceladus's subsurface ocean. Models indicate that the large rocky core is porous, allowing water to flow through it, transferring heat and chemicals. This was confirmed by observations and other research. Molecular hydrogen (H_{2}), a geochemical source of energy that can be metabolized by methanogen microbes to provide energy for life, could be present if, as models suggest, Enceladus's salty ocean has an alkaline pH from serpentinization of chondritic rock.

The presence of an internal global salty ocean with an aquatic environment supported by global ocean circulation patterns, with an energy source and complex organic compounds in contact with Enceladus's rocky core, are of great interest in astrobiology and the study of potentially habitable environments for microbial extraterrestrial life. Geochemical modelling results before the detection of phosphorus indicated that Enceladus met potential abiogenesis-requirements.

In June 2023, astronomers reported that various phosphates had been detected on Enceladus, completing the set of basic chemical ingredients for life there (carbon, hydrogen, nitrogen, oxygen, sulfur and phosporus).

The presence of a wide range of organic compounds and ammonia indicates their source may be similar to the water/rock reactions known to occur on Earth and that are known to support life. Therefore, several robotic missions have been proposed to further explore Enceladus and assess its habitability. Some of the proposed missions are: Journey to Enceladus and Titan (JET), Enceladus Explorer (En-Ex), Enceladus Life Finder (ELF), Life Investigation For Enceladus (LIFE), and Enceladus Life Signatures and Habitability (ELSAH).

Astronomers discovered, for the first time on December 14, 2023, hydrogen cyanide in the plumes of Enceladus. This molecule is a known precursor to DNA and amino acids, and its detection came alongside other organic compounds that scientists have yet to fully identify. According to the researchers, "these [newly discovered] compounds could potentially support extant microbial communities or drive complex organic synthesis leading to the origin of life."

=== Hydrothermal vents ===
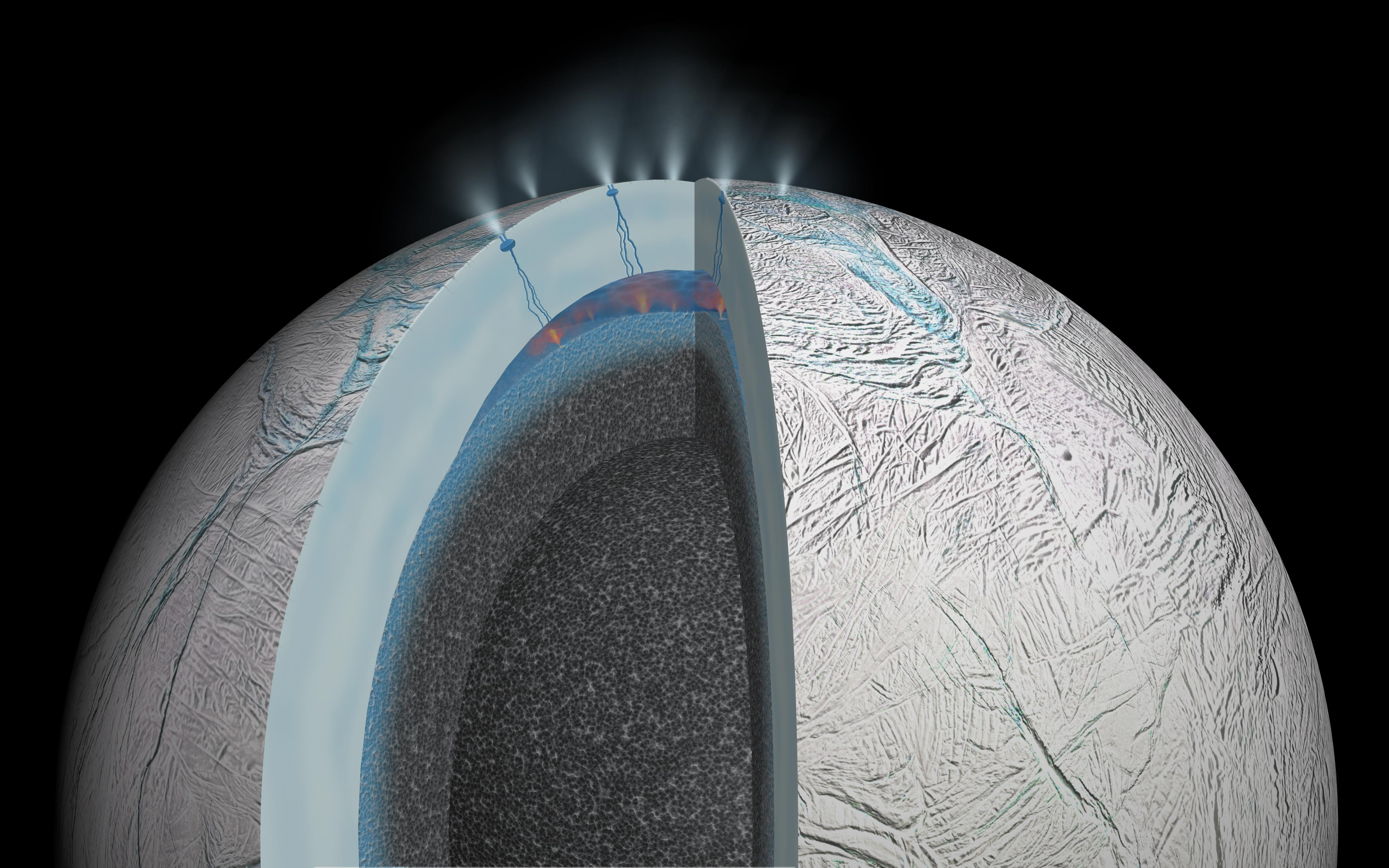
An artist's impression of possible hydrothermal activity on Enceladus's ocean floor

On April 13, 2017, NASA announced the discovery of possible hydrothermal activity on Enceladus's sub-surface ocean floor. In 2015, the Cassini probe made a close fly-by of Enceladus's south pole, flying within 48.3 km (30.0 mi) of the surface, as well as through a plume in the process. A mass spectrometer on the craft detected molecular hydrogen (H_{2}) from the plume, and after months of analysis, the conclusion was made that the hydrogen was most likely the result of hydrothermal activity beneath the surface. It has been speculated that such activity could be a potential oasis of habitability.

The presence of ample hydrogen in Enceladus's ocean means that microbes – if any exist there – could use it to obtain energy by combining the hydrogen with carbon dioxide dissolved in the water. The chemical reaction is known as "methanogenesis" because it produces methane as a byproduct, and is at the root of the tree of life on Earth, the birthplace of all life that is known to exist.

== Exploration ==
=== Voyager missions ===
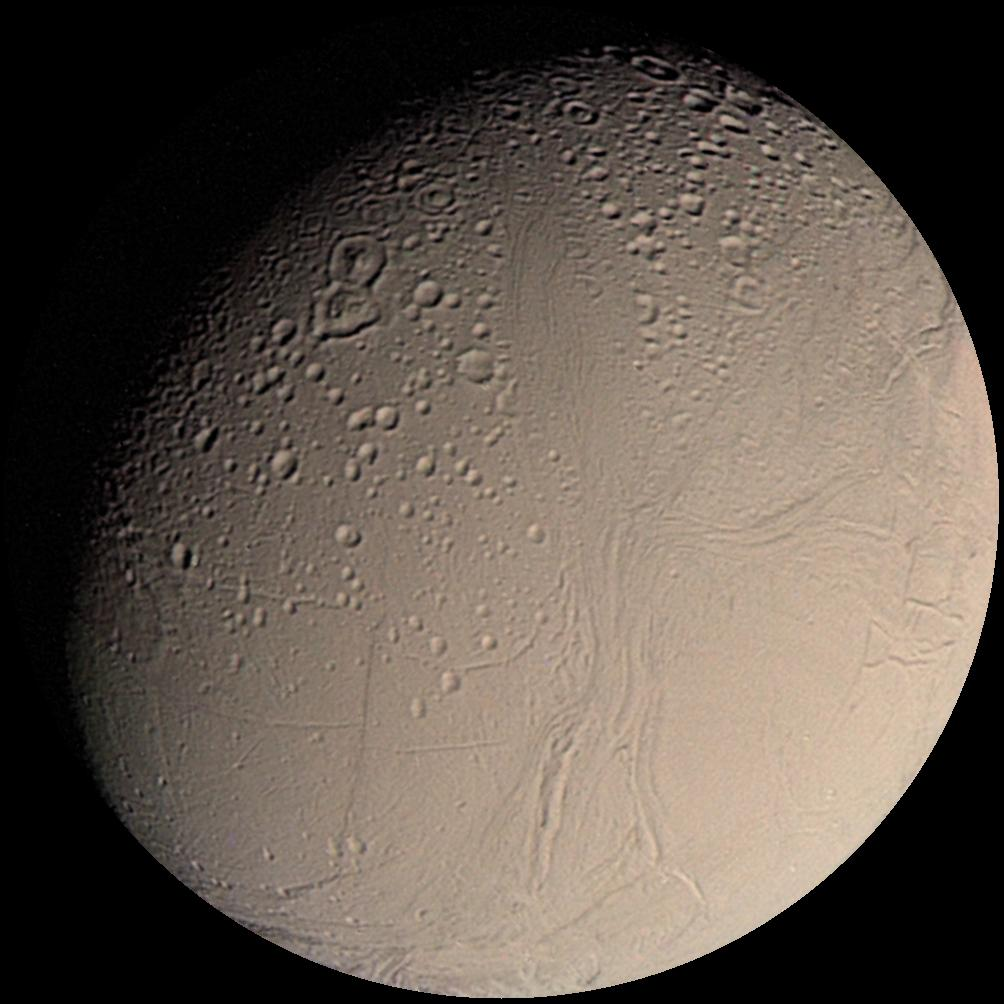
Voyager 2's image mosaic of Enceladus

The two Voyager spacecraft made the first close-up images of Enceladus. Voyager 1 was the first to fly past Enceladus, at a distance of 202,000 km on November 12, 1980. Images acquired from this distance had very poor spatial resolution, but revealed a highly reflective surface devoid of impact craters, indicating a youthful surface. Voyager 1 also confirmed that Enceladus was embedded in the densest part of Saturn's diffuse E ring. Combined with the apparent youthful appearance of the surface, Voyager scientists suggested that the E ring consisted of particles vented from Enceladus's surface. In 2017, a reprocessing of departure images from the probe revealed a possible precovery image of Enceladus's plumes.

Voyager 2 passed closer to Enceladus (87,010 km) on August 26, 1981, allowing higher-resolution images to be obtained. These images showed a young surface. They also revealed a surface with different regions with vastly different surface ages, with a heavily cratered mid- to high-northern latitude region, and a lightly cratered region closer to the equator. This geologic diversity contrasts with the ancient, heavily cratered surface of Mimas, another moon of Saturn slightly smaller than Enceladus. The geologically youthful terrains came as a great surprise to the scientific community, because no theory was then able to predict that such a small (and cold, compared to Jupiter's highly active moon Io) celestial body could bear signs of such activity.

=== Cassini ===
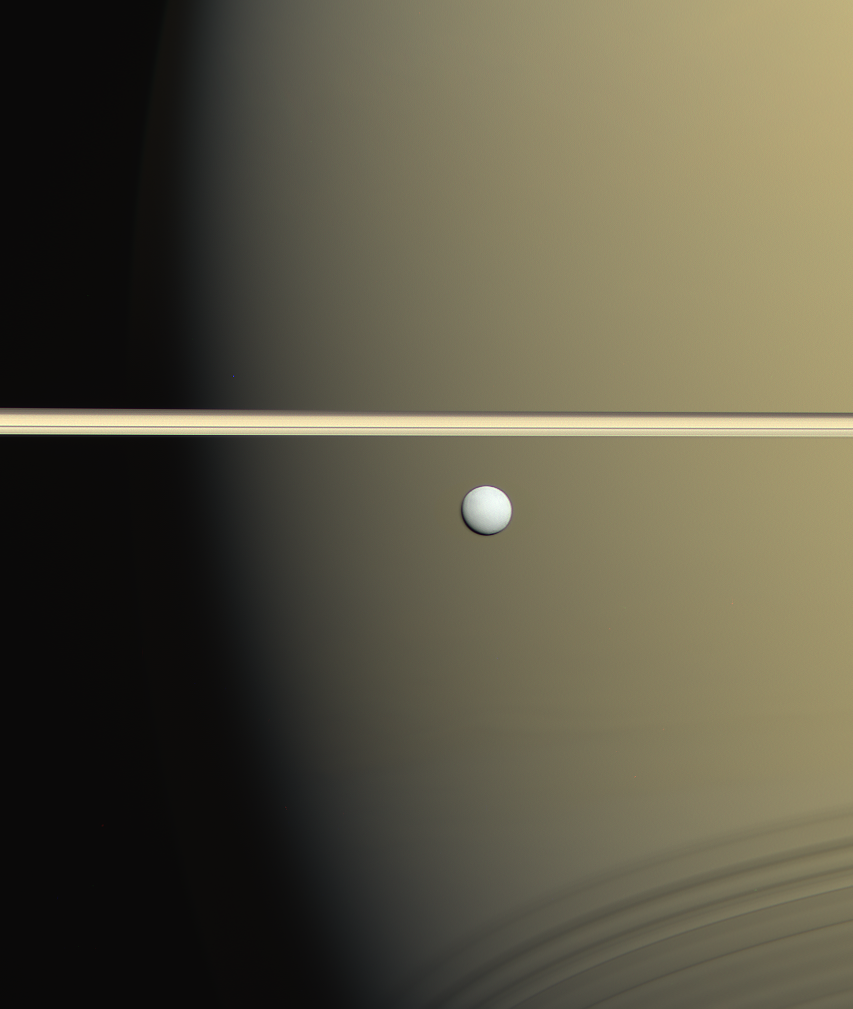
A picture of Enceladus in parallel with Saturn's ring, taken by Cassini in January 2006

The answers to many remaining mysteries of Enceladus had to wait until the arrival of the Cassini spacecraft on July 1, 2004, when it entered orbit around Saturn. Given the results from the Voyager 2 images, Enceladus was considered a priority target by the Cassini mission planners, and several targeted flybys within 1,500 km of the surface were planned as well as numerous, "non-targeted" opportunities within 100,000 km of Enceladus. The flybys have yielded significant information concerning Enceladus's surface, as well as the discovery of water vapour with traces of simple hydrocarbons venting from the geologically active south polar region.

These discoveries prompted the adjustment of Cassini's flight plan to allow closer flybys of Enceladus, including an encounter in March 2008 that took it to within 48 km of the surface. Cassini's extended mission included seven close flybys of Enceladus between July 2008 and July 2010, including two passes at only 50 km in the later half of 2008. Cassini performed a flyby on October 28, 2015, passing as close as 49 km (30 mi) and through a plume. Confirmation of molecular hydrogen (H_{2}) would be an independent line of evidence that hydrothermal activity is taking place in the Enceladus seafloor, increasing its habitability.

Cassini has provided strong evidence that Enceladus has an ocean with an energy source, nutrients and organic molecules, making Enceladus one of the best places for the study of potentially habitable environments for extraterrestrial life.

On December 14, 2023, astronomers reported the first time discovery, in the plumes of Enceladus, of hydrogen cyanide, a possible chemical essential for life as we know it, as well as other organic molecules, some of which are yet to be better identified and understood. According to the researchers, "these [newly discovered] compounds could potentially support extant microbial communities or drive complex organic synthesis leading to the origin of life."

=== Proposed mission concepts ===
The discoveries Cassini made at Enceladus have prompted studies into follow-up mission concepts, including Journey to Enceladus and Titan (JET), a probe flyby to analyse plume contents in situ, Enceladus Explorer (EnEx), a lander funded by the German Aerospace Center to study the habitability potential of its subsurface ocean, and two astrobiology-oriented mission concepts, the Enceladus Life Finder (ELF) and Life Investigation For Enceladus (LIFE).

The European Space Agency (ESA) was assessing concepts in 2008 to send a probe to Enceladus in a mission to be combined with studies of Titan: Titan Saturn System Mission (TSSM). TSSM was a joint NASA/ESA flagship-class proposal for exploration of Saturn's moons, with a focus on Enceladus, and it was competing against the Europa Jupiter System Mission (EJSM) proposal for funding. In February 2009, it was announced that NASA/ESA had given the EJSM mission priority ahead of TSSM, although TSSM will continue to be studied and evaluated.

In November 2017, Russian billionaire Yuri Milner expressed interest in funding a "low-cost, privately funded mission to Enceladus which can be launched relatively soon." In September 2018, NASA and the Breakthrough Initiatives, founded by Milner, signed a cooperation agreement for the mission's initial concept phase. The spacecraft would be low-cost, low mass, and would be launched at high speed on an affordable rocket. The spacecraft would be directed to perform a single flyby through Enceladus's plumes in order to sample and analyse its content for biosignatures. NASA provided scientific and technical expertise through various reviews, from March 2019 to December 2019.

In 2022, the Planetary Science Decadal Survey by the National Academy of Sciences recommended that NASA prioritize its newest probe concept, the Enceladus Orbilander, as a Flagship-class mission, alongside its newest concepts for a Mars sample-return mission and the Uranus Orbiter and Probe. The Enceladus Orbilander would be launched on a similarly affordable rocket, but would cost about $5 billion, and be designed to endure eighteen months in orbit inspecting Enceladus's plumes before landing and spending two Earth years conducting surface astrobiology research.

In 2024, ESA named a mission to Enceladus its top priority. Currently known as the L4 mission, it is an orbiter and lander proposed for launch in 2042, with arrival at Enceladus in 2053.

Year proposed	Proponent	Project name	Status	References
2006	NASA	EAGLE study	Not selected	
2006	NASA	'Titan and Enceladus $1B Mission Feasibility' Study	Not selected	
2007	NASA	'Enceladus Flagship' study	Not selected	
2007	ESA	Titan and Enceladus Mission (TandEM)	Not selected	
2007	NASA JPL	Enceladus RMA Study	Not selected	
2008	NASA/ESA	TandEM became Titan Saturn System Mission (TSSM)	Not selected	
2010	NASA	Enceladus Orbiter	Not selected	
2011	NASA JPL	Journey to Enceladus and Titan (JET)	Not selected	
2012	DLR	Enceladus Explorer (EnEx) lander, employing the IceMole	Not selected	
2012	NASA JPL	Life Investigation For Enceladus (LIFE)	Not selected	
2015	NASA JPL	Enceladus Life Finder (ELF)	Not selected	
2015	NASA	THEO	Not selected	
2017	ESA/NASA	Explorer of Enceladus and Titan (E^{2}T)	Not selected	
2017	NASA	Enceladus Life Signatures and Habitability (ELSAH)	Not selected	
2017	Breakthrough Initiatives	Breakthrough Enceladus mission	Proposed	
2021	NASA	Tiger	Not selected	
2022	NASA	Enceladus Orbilander	Proposed	
2022	ESA	Moonraker	Not selected	
2024	ESA	L4, lander and orbiter	Proposed	
2025	CNSA	Unnamed mission	Proposed	

== See also ==
- Enceladus in fiction
- List of extraterrestrial volcanoes
- List of geological features on Enceladus
- List of natural satellites
