= Beyond =

Beyond may refer to:

== Arts, entertainment, and media ==
=== Films ===
- Beyond (1921 film), an American silent film
- Beyond (2000 film), a Danish film directed by Åke Sandgren, OT: Dykkerne
- Beyond (2010 film), a Swedish film directed by Pernilla August, OT: Svinalängorna
- Beyond (2012 film), an American thriller directed by Josef Rusnak
- Beyond (2014 film), a British science fiction film
- "Beyond", a segment of the short-film collection The Animatrix
- Star Trek Beyond, a 2016 American science fiction film in the Star Trek film franchise

=== Games ===
- Beyond Games, a U.S. video game developer founded in 1992
- Beyond: Two Souls, a 2013 video game by Quantic Dream
- Metroid Prime 4: Beyond, a video game in the Metroid franchise
- Stormfront Studios, a U.S. video game developer originally named Beyond Software (1988–1991)
- Beyond (Paranoia Press), a 1981 supplement for the role-playing game Traveller

=== Music ===
==== Groups ====
- Beyond (band), a Hong Kong rock band formed in 1983
- Beyond (Swiss band), a spiritual musical group founded in 2007 by Swiss singer Regula Curti, along with Tina Turner and Dechen Shak-Dagsay

==== Albums ====
- Beyond..., a 1986 album by Kiyotaka Sugiyama
- Beyond (Dinosaur Jr. album), 2007
- Beyond (Freedom Call album), 2014
- Beyond (Omnium Gatherum album), 2013
- Beyond (Joshua Redman album), 2000
- Beyond, a 2008 album by William Joseph
- Beyond, a 2004 album by Hiromitsu Agatsuma
- Beyond, a 1980 album by Herb Alpert

==== Songs ====
- "Beyond" (Moody Blues song), a 1969 instrumental song from the album To Our Children's Children's Children by The Moody Blues
- "Beyond" (Leon Bridges song), a 2018 song from the Leon Bridges album Good Thing
- "Beyond" (Corey Taylor song), a 2023 song from the Corey Taylor album CMF2
- "Beyond", a 2001 song by Nebula from the album Charged
- "Beyond", a song from the album Trouser Jazz by Mr. Scruff, 2002
- "Beyond", first track from the album Buddhist and Christian Prayers by Beyond, 2010
- "Beyond", a song from the album Random Access Memories by Daft Punk, 2013

=== In print ===
- Beyond (book), a 2015 non-fiction book by Chris Impey
- Beyond (Virgin Comics), a 2008 series from Virgin Comics
- Beyond!, a 2006 limited series from Marvel Comics
- Beyond Corporation, a fictional Marvel Comics organisation
- "Beyond", a short story by William Faulkner
- Beyond: Peter Diamandis and the Adventure of Space, former title of Julian Guthrie's book How to Make a Spaceship (2016)
- Beyond Fantasy Fiction, a US fantasy fiction magazine

=== Television ===
- Beyond (2005 TV series), a Canadian paranormal documentary TV series
- Beyond (2012 TV series), a Singaporean supernatural TV series
- Beyond (2017 TV series), an American supernatural drama TV series
- Beyond, a 2006 American TV pilot show directed by Breck Eisner
- "Beyond", an Avengers Assemble season 4 episode
- Beyond International, an Australian television production and distribution company
- Showtime Beyond, the former name of Showtime multiplex channel SHO×BET

== Other uses ==
- Beyond, Inc., US, formerly Overstock, Inc., owner of Bed Bath & Beyond
- Beyond Junior Y Chair, a high chair
- Lashauwn Beyond, American drag queen

== See also ==
- The Beyond (disambiguation)
