= Talking About Life =

Book by Chris Impey

Talking About Life: Conversations on Astrobiology
- Author: Chris Impey
- Subject: Astronomy
- Genre: Non-fiction
- Publisher: Cambridge University Press
- Publication date: September 30, 2010 (hardcover)
- Media type: Print (hardcover) and electronic
- Pages: 418
- ISBN: 978-0521514927
- Preceded by: How It Ends
- Followed by: How It Began

Talking About Life: Conversations on Astrobiology is a non-fiction book edited by astronomer Chris Impey that consists of interviews with three dozen leading experts on the subject of astrobiology. The subject matter ranges from the nature and limits of life on Earth to the current search for exoplanets and the prospects of intelligent life in the universe. The book was published as a hardcover by Cambridge University Press in 2010.

== Summary ==
Talking About Life: Conversations on Astrobiology is a book of interviews between astronomer Chris Impey and leading researchers in the effort to understand life on Earth and discover habitable worlds and biology beyond Earth. The book is a snapshot of a fast-moving interdisciplinary field, with a conversational tone, where researchers describe what they do in their own words and convey the excitement of addressing fundamental questions about the universe.

The first section has a range of perspectives on the general topic of life in the universe. Timothy Ferris, noted writer and journalist, talks about being involved in the planning for the Voyager record and on astrobiology in the popular culture. Steven Dick and Iris Fry talk about the history of the search for life in the universe and the history of theories of the origin of life on Earth, respectively. Ann Druyan discusses her long association with Carl Sagan and her work in science education. Neil Tyson, Director of the Hayden Planetarium, talks about our halting progress in space travel and the prospects for venturing to find life among the stars. George “Pinky” Nelson gives an astronaut’s perspective on life on Earth and elsewhere, and Steve Benner and William Bains speculate on altering the architecture of life on Earth and on how strange life beyond Earth may be.

The second section of the book turns to the history of life on Earth. Roger Buick talks about the earliest evidence for biology and John Baross talks about its possible origin on the sea floor. Lynn Rothschild talks about extremophiles and the extraordinary modes of adaptation of terrestrial organisms. Joe Kirschvink presents the evidence for Snowball Earth and the challenges that a restless planet presents for biology. Andrew Knoll and Simon Conway Morris discuss natural selection and the contrasting themes of contingency and convergence. As two examples of "alien" intelligence on Earth, Roger Hanlon talks about his field work with octopuses and Lori Marino talks about her research on dolphins.

Turning to the Solar System, the next section of the book looks at the prospects for life on our doorstep. Chris McKay and Peter Smith talk about Mars and the potential for extant microbial life under the surface layer. Speculating about more exotic habitats for life, David Grinspoon considers Venus and Jupiter’s moon Io, then Jonathan Lunine considers Saturn’s large moon Titan. Carolyn Porco notes the surprising results from the Cassini mission, including the habitability of Enceladus. The biological potential of meteorites is the subject of the interviews with Laurie Leshin and Jesuit Guy Consolmagno, who note the presence of the complex building blocks of life in this primordial material from the outer Solar System.

The next section of the book covers the fast-moving research on planets around other stars. Alan Boss discusses the theory of extrasolar planets or exoplanets, and ace planet-hunters Debra Fischer and Geoff Marcy talk about their properties and the technical innovations that led to their discovery. Sara Seager summarizes efforts to characterize exoplanets in detail, and David Charbonneau talks about the power of the transit method for detecting low mass and Earth-like planets. Last, Vicky Meadows describes how planet models will be used to predict the spectral biomarkers that could indirectly indicate the presence of microbial life on an exoplanet.

Talking About Life ends with the search for intelligent life (SETI) and speculation about the role of life in the universe. Jill Tarter and Seth Shostak describe the strategies that have been used to listen for artificial signal from technological civilizations far from Earth for over fifty years, so far without success. Ray Kurzweil talks about postbiological evolution and Nick Bostrom talks about transhumanism and the odds that the entire universe, and our sense of it and ourselves, is a simulation by a super-intelligent civilization. Next, Paul Davies and Martin Rees talk about fine-tuning and the anthropic principle, which each indicate that biology has a privileged role in the cosmos. To round out the book with a humanistic perspective, Ben Bova talks about our future in space and Jennifer Michael Hecht rekindles our delight in alien yet familiar life on Earth.
