= From Beyond =

From Beyond may refer to:

- "From Beyond" (short story), a 1934 story by H. P. Lovecraft
- From Beyond (film), a 1986 film based on the Lovecraft story
- From Beyond (Massacre album), 1991
- From Beyond (Enforcer album), 2015

== See also ==
- Beyond (disambiguation)
