= Chris Impey =

British astronomer, educator, and author (born 1956)

Christopher David Impey
- Born: 25 January 1956 (age 70); Edinburgh, Scotland, United Kingdom
- Education: Imperial College London (BSc); University of Edinburgh (PhD)
- Scientific career
- Fields: Astronomy, observational cosmology, education
- Workplaces: University of Arizona; California Institute of Technology; University of Hawaiʻi

Christopher David Impey (born 25 January 1956) is a British astronomer, educator, and author. He has been a faculty member at the University of Arizona since 1986. Impey has done research on observational cosmology, in particular low surface brightness galaxies, the intergalactic medium, and surveys of active galaxies and quasars. As an educator, he has pioneered the use of instructional technology for teaching science to undergraduate non-science majors. He has written many technical articles and a series of popular science books including The Living Cosmos, How It Began, How It Ends: From You to the Universe, Dreams of Other Worlds, and Humble Before the Void. He served as Vice-President of the American Astronomical Society, he is a Fellow of the American Association for the Advancement of Science, and a Howard Hughes Medical Institute Professor. He serves on the Advisory Council of METI (Messaging Extraterrestrial Intelligence).

== Biography ==
Impey was born in Edinburgh, Scotland, and spent his childhood mostly in New York and London, attending 11 schools. He got a 1st class honours BSc in Physics at Imperial College of Science and Technology, part of the University of London, in 1977. After an internship working on a neutrino calorimeter at CERN under Jack Steinberger, he went to the University of Edinburgh for graduate school in astronomy. He earned a PhD under the supervision of Peter Brand and Ray Wolstencroft in 1981.

He worked at the Institute for Astronomy at the University of Hawaiʻi from 1981 to 1983 as a UK Science Research Council/NATO Fellow, then at California Institute of Technology from 1983 to 1986 as a Weingart Fellow. Impey has been on the faculty of the Department of Astronomy/Steward Observatory at the University of Arizona since 1986, since 2000 as a University Distinguished Professor. He is Deputy Department Head in charge of academic programs, leading the nation's largest undergraduate astronomy majors program, its second largest astronomy PhD program, and one of the largest programs to teach astronomy to non-science majors.

== Research ==
Working mostly in the fields of extragalactic astronomy and observational cosmology, Impey has over 170 refereed publications and 70 published conference proceedings. His early work was on the sub-class of active galactic nuclei called BL Lac objects, now thought to be highly luminous and variable extragalactic sources where our sightline looks nearly down the spin axis of a supermassive black hole emitting twin relativistic jets. In the 1980s he was a heavy user of the first wave of large optical telescopes on Mauna Kea in Hawaii.

As a postdoc at Caltech he worked with Greg Bothun at the University of Oregon on the properties of dim and diffuse stellar systems that tend to be missing from most galaxy surveys. Working with the noted Australian astrophotographer David Malin, they discovered the largest spiral galaxy known, dubbed Malin 1. He also continued his thesis work on BL Lac objects, using a travelling polarimeter that toured many of the world's observatories, including Kitt Peak in Arizona, Palomar in California, Las Campanas and Cerro Tololo in Chile, Sutherland in South Africa, and the Special Astrophysical Observatory in the Caucasus region of Russia.

He was a heavy early user of the Hubble Space Telescope, getting time in each of the first eight cycles of observation. At Steward Observatory in the 1990s, he studied the intergalactic medium using multiple quasars to probe the three dimensional structure of the hot, diffuse gas in galaxies, which contains as many baryons as the sum of all the stars in the universe. He also studied gravitational lensing using the exquisite image quality and stability of the HST.

Over the past decade, he has been a major participant of the Cosmic Evolution Survey (COSMOS), led by Nick Scoville at Caltech. He led the spectroscopic follow-up of active galaxies and quasars selected by their X-ray emission, with a goal of charting the growth and fuelling rate of the massive black holes that are now known to exist in every galaxy. Impey's research has been supported by over $20 million in grants from NASA and the National Science Foundation.

== Education ==
Impey is a pioneer in the use of instructional technology in the classroom. He was the lead author of the University of Arizona plan for instructional computing in the 1990s and he gave the first invited education talk at an American Astronomical Society meeting. He has been on the editorial boards of the Astronomy Education Review and the Encyclopedia of the Cosmos, and served on the board of directors of the Astronomical Society of the Pacific. He is on the International Executive Committee of the Inspiration of Astronomical Phenomena series of meetings. He has written over 40 articles on education, pedagogy, and science literacy.

He is the winner of seven teaching awards at the University of Arizona and he has taught over 5000 students, mostly in introductory astronomy classes for non-science majors. He taught part of an astrobiology class in the 3D virtual world called Second Life, and more recently he has taught a massive open online course (MOOC) to over 2000 people using the Udemy platform. Impey is the creator of the web site Teach Astronomy, which has gone from peak traffic of 100 visitors a day after its launch in 2012 to 600–700 visitors a day one year later. Teach Astronomy has a full online textbook, over a thousand short video clips, and it also aggregates articles from Wikipedia, nearly 10,000 astronomical images and over a thousand podcasts.

Impey enjoys conveying the excitement of astronomy to general audiences. Several times he has been an eclipse cruise lecturer, and since 2000 he has been a Harlow Shapley Visiting Lecturer and a Smithsonian Associates Lecturer. In 2007, he was a Phi Beta Kappa Visiting Scholar. He has given the Cave lecture at the University of Kingston, the Benjamin Dean Lecture at the California Academy of Sciences, a TEDx lecture in Tucson, and the Robinson Lecture at the Armagh Observatory in Northern Ireland. He gives about twenty public talks a year, to audiences as diverse as kindergartners, NASA engineers, and Tibetan Buddhist monks. In 2014, he was named a Howard Hughes Medical Institute Professor, and awarded $1 million to improve undergraduate education.

== Writing ==
Impey has written a number of popular science books, marked by their incorporation of cutting edge research, and the use of vignettes that place the reader in unfamiliar scenes. The Living Cosmos (2007) is a survey of the emerging field of astrobiology, published initially by Random House and in 2011 republished by Cambridge University Press.

Also with Cambridge University Press, he published a set of interviews with leading researchers in astrobiology, called Talking About Life (2010). He has edited a book on astrobiology based on his long-time association with the Vatican Observatory astronomers, called Frontiers of Astrobiology. He edited a book on the ethical and philosophical implications of the search for extraterrestrial life called Encountering Life in the Universe.

With planetary scientist Bill Hartmann he wrote two introductory textbooks for college-level astronomy, The Cosmic Journey (1994) and The Universe Revealed (2000). On the subject of cosmology, he has written about the origin of the Universe in How It Began (2012) and about the long-term fate of the Universe in How It Ends (2010). With English professor Holly Henry he has written a survey of the scientific and cultural impact of iconic NASA missions in Dreams of Other Worlds (2013). His most recent book, Humble Before the Void (2014), based on teaching cosmology to Tibetan Buddhists in India as part of the Science for Monks program. In 2013, he published his first novel, Shadow World.

== Awards ==
- National Academy of Sciences Slipher Award (1998)
- National Science Foundation Distinguished Teaching Scholar (2002)
- Carnegie Foundation for the Advancement of Teaching Arizona Professor of the Year (2002)
- Phi Beta Kappa Visiting Scholar (2006)
- Astronomical Society of the Pacific Richard H. Emmons Award for Excellence in College Astronomy Teaching (2007)
- Fellow of the American Association for the Advancement of Science (2009)
- Princeton University Stanley Kelley Visiting Professor for Distinguished Teaching (2011)
- Anglo-Australian Observatory Distinguished Visitor (2014)
- Howard Hughes Medical Institute Professor (2014)
- Elected a Legacy Fellow of the American Astronomical Society in 2020.

== Books ==
- Astronomy: The Cosmic Journey, with William Hartmann (1994) ISBN 0-534-21192-5
- International Symposium on Astrophysics Research and Science Education, editor (1999) ISBN 0-268-03155-X
- The Universe Revealed, with William Hartmann (2000) ISBN 0-534-24894-2
- Science and Theology: Ruminations on the Cosmos, edited with Cathy Petry (2003) ISBN 88-209-6888-6
- International Symposium on Astrophysics Research and on the Dialogue Between Science and Religion, edited with Cathy Petry (2003) ISBN 88-209-6890-8
- The Living Cosmos: Our Search for Life in the Universe (2007) ISBN 978-1-4000-6506-6
- Talking About Life: Conversations on Astrobiology, editor (2010) ISBN 978-0-521-51492-7
- How It Ends: From You to the Universe (2010) ISBN 978-0-393-06985-3
- How It Began: A Time Travelers Guide to the Universe (2012) ISBN 978-0-393-08002-5
- Frontiers of Astrobiology, edited with Jonathan Lunine and José Funes (2012) ISBN 978-1-107-00641-6
- Encountering Life in the Universe: Ethical Foundations and Social Implications of Astrobiology, edited with Bill Stoeger and Anna Spitz (2013) ISBN 978-0-8165-2870-7
- Dreams of Other Worlds: The Amazing Story of Unmanned Space Exploration, with Holly Henry (2013) ISBN 978-0-691-14753-6
- Shadow World, novel (2013) ISBN 978-0989817615
- Humble before the Void: A Western Astronomer, His Journey East, and a Remarkable Encounter between Western Science and Tibetan Buddhism (2014) ISBN 978-1-599-47392-5
- Beyond: Our Future in Space (2015) ISBN 978-0393239300
- Imagining Other Worlds: Explorations in Astronomy and Culture, with Nicholas Campion (2018) ISBN 978-1-907767-11-1
- Einstein's Monsters: The Life and Times of Black Holes, W. W. Norton & Company, 2018, ISBN 978-1-324-00093-8.
- Worlds Without End: Exoplanets, Habitability, and the Future of Humanity, MIT Press, 2023, ISBN 978-0262047661

== Articles ==
- The Living Cosmos: A Fabric That Binds Art and Science
- Astronomy in the United States
- Science Literacy in the United States
- Big Questions Online
- How It Began
- American Scientist Nightstand
- Chronicle of Higher Education
- Teaching in Second Life
- The End of the Universe
- Coast to Coast Interview
