= Beyond Junior Y Chair =

Convertible high chair

- Type: High chair
- Inception: 2012
- Manufacturer: Abiie
- Available: Available

The Beyond Junior Y Chair is a high chair designed and sold by Abiie. It is an adjustable high chair made from European beech wood that can be converted into a dining chair for adults. It is one of the best-known high chairs in North America.

== Design ==
The Beyond Junior Y Chair is a modern high chair with a natural wood finish that is made from European beech wood. It is equipped with "EZ-Seat" technology, which allows the seat's height to be adjusted after pressing plastic levers on the sides of the chair. This technology enables users to slide out the seat's bottom and footrest, allowing them to be placed in new positions. The wood's surface is also treated to be anti-microbial.

== History ==
The Beyond Junior Y Chair was developed by Abiie, an Austin-based company founded in 2007.

The Beyond Junior Y Chair was featured in an episode of the Hallmark Channel's Home & Family, which aired on August 14, 2015. It was featured in the "Testing Products for Your Kids" segment, hosted by Matt Rogers. The Beyond Junior Y Chair won the Gold award at the 2015 National Parenting Publications Awards. In 2016, the chair was also featured on the Steve Harvey Mother's Day episode of the talk show Steve.

In 2022, the chair was featured on The Ellen DeGeneres Show for Mother's Day.

== See also ==
- List of chairs
- High chair
