= The Living Cosmos =

Book by Chris Impey

The Living Cosmos: Our Search for Life in the Universe
- First edition
- Author: Chris Impey
- Subject: Astronomy
- Genre: Non-fiction
- Publisher: Random House
- Publication date: 11 December 2011 (paperback)
- Media type: Print (Hardcover and paperback) and electronic (e-book)
- Pages: 393
- ISBN: 978-0521173841
- Followed by: How It Ends

The Living Cosmos: Our Search for Life in the Universe is a non-fiction book by the astronomer Chris Impey that discusses the subject of astrobiology and efforts to discover life beyond Earth. It was published as a hardcover by Random House in 2007 and as a paperback by Cambridge University Press in 2011.

== Summary ==
The Living Cosmos is a non-fiction book by University of Arizona professor of astronomy Chris Impey on the status of astrobiology. It summarizes the state of research as scientists trying to address one of the most profound questions we can ask about nature: Is there life in the universe beyond the Earth? The author interviewed dozens of leading researchers, and he includes material from the interviews and vignettes of the researchers in the book. The companion web site to the book contains articles and video clips on astrobiology produced by the author, as well as a glossary and links to other relevant sites.

The book begins with a review of the cosmic setting for life and reviews the insights of astronomy since Copernicus. The discovery that we live in a "biological universe" would be a continuation of the progression where there is nothing exceptional about the setting of the Earth and the events that have occurred on this planet.

Subsequent chapters consider the origin of life on Earth, and the physical extremes to which life as adapted. In astrobiology, it pays to think "outside the box" and imagine how strange life might be or whether post-biological evolution is possible, where the basis is mechanical or computational. A chapter on evolution shows how it is affected by the cosmic environment.

Possibilities of life in the Solar System are considered next, with emphasis on Mars, Titan, and outer moons harboring liquid water. Next is a summary of the rapidly changing state of play in the search for extrasolar planets or exoplanets. After centuries of speculation and decades of futile searching, planets around other stars were first discovered in 1995 and the number is now over 850, with several thousand more candidates from the Kepler mission. The book ends with the search for extraterrestrial intelligence (SETI) and the use of the Drake equation to frame discussions of cosmic companionship.

The web site for the book features images of a set of seven mixed media, boxed construction art pieces by Heather Green, commissioned specially for the book. The art is on permanent display in the BIO5 Institute at the University of Arizona. An article on the collaboration between Heather Green and Chris Impey and the artistic and scientific themes of the work was published in the Leonardo Journal online.

== Reception ==
The Living Cosmos was generally very well received. It received a starred review from Kirkus Reviews, referring to the book as a "Lively, clear, and up-to-date overview of astronomy, cosmology, biology, and evolution, specifically as related to the search for extraterrestrial life". Popular magazine Entertainment Weekly gave the book a grade of B+, saying it was "not an easy read" but calling it a "live, elegant overview". It was reviewed by Nature, Physics Today, and New Scientist, with the latter commenting on occasional digressions, but declaring the book "beautifully written". Reader reviews are 85% five stars on Amazon and over 90% like the book on Goodreads. The 2011 paperback edition has updates to help keep up with the accelerating pace of exoplanet discovery.
