= Richard B. Hoover =

American astrobiologist

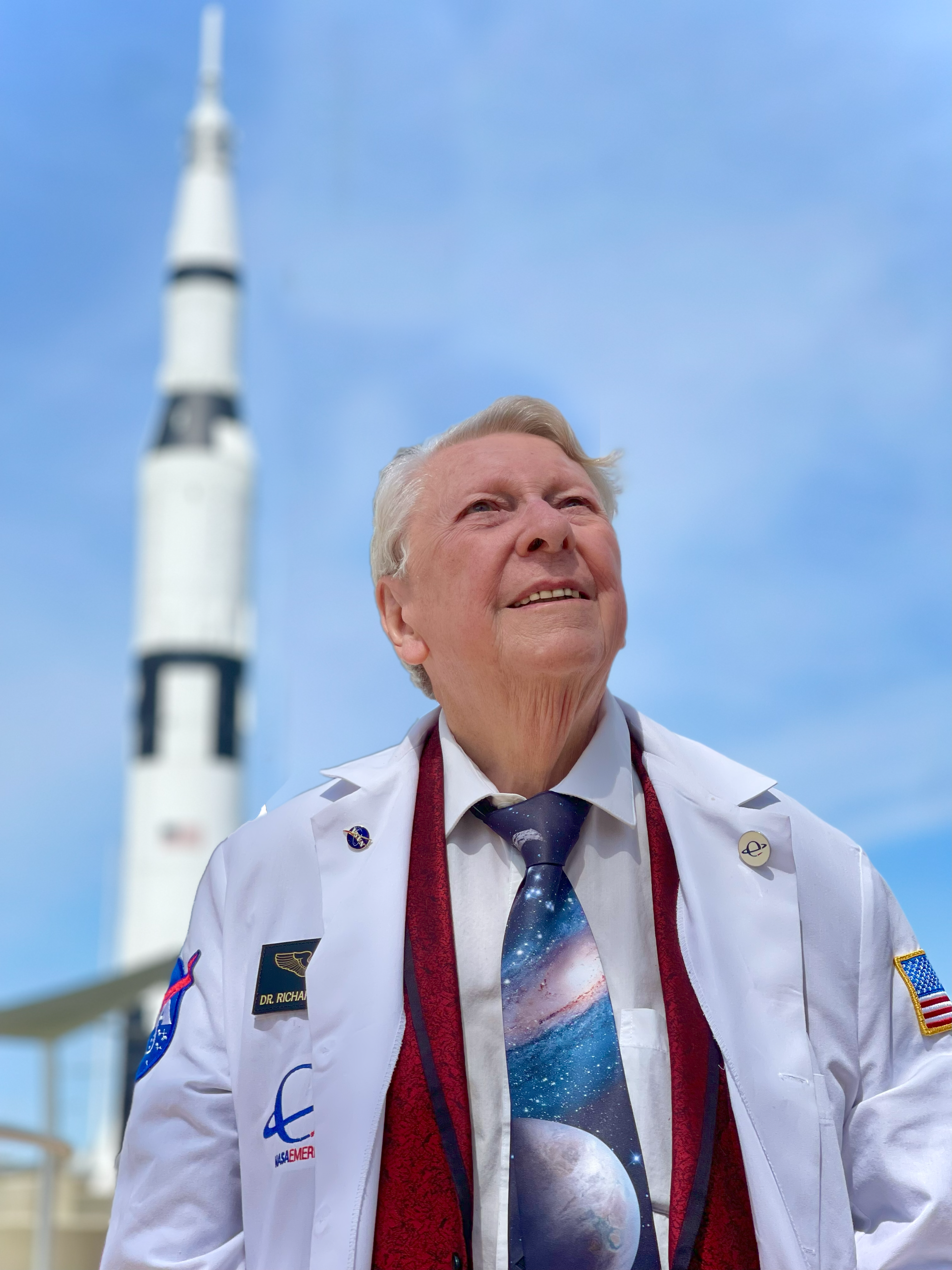
Dr. Hoover at the US Space and Rocket Center

Richard Brice Hoover (born January 3, 1943) is a physicist who has authored 33 volumes and 250 papers on astrobiology, extremophiles, diatoms, solar physics, X-ray/EUV optics and meteorites. He holds 11 U.S. patents and was 1992 NASA Inventor of the Year. He was employed at the United States' NASA Marshall Space Flight Center from 1966 to 2012, where he worked on astrophysics and astrobiology. He established the Astrobiology Group there in 1997 and until his retirement in late 2011 he headed their astrobiology research. He conducted research on microbial extremophiles in the Antarctic, microfossils, and chemical biomarkers in precambrian rocks and in carbonaceous chondrite meteorites. Hoover has published claims to have discovered fossilized microorganisms in a collection of select meteorites on multiple occasions.

== Early life ==
Hoover was born in Sikeston, Missouri on January 3, 1943. He obtained his B.Sc. degree with majors in physics, mathematics and French in 1964 from Henderson State University in Arkadelphia, Arkansas. He did graduate work in theoretical mathematics at Duke University on an NSF fellowship translating the Nicolas Bourbaki French volume on multi-dimensional vector spaces, and was completing his thesis on X-ray diffraction in the Physics Department of the University of Arkansas when he left the University in 1966 to join NASA.

== Career ==
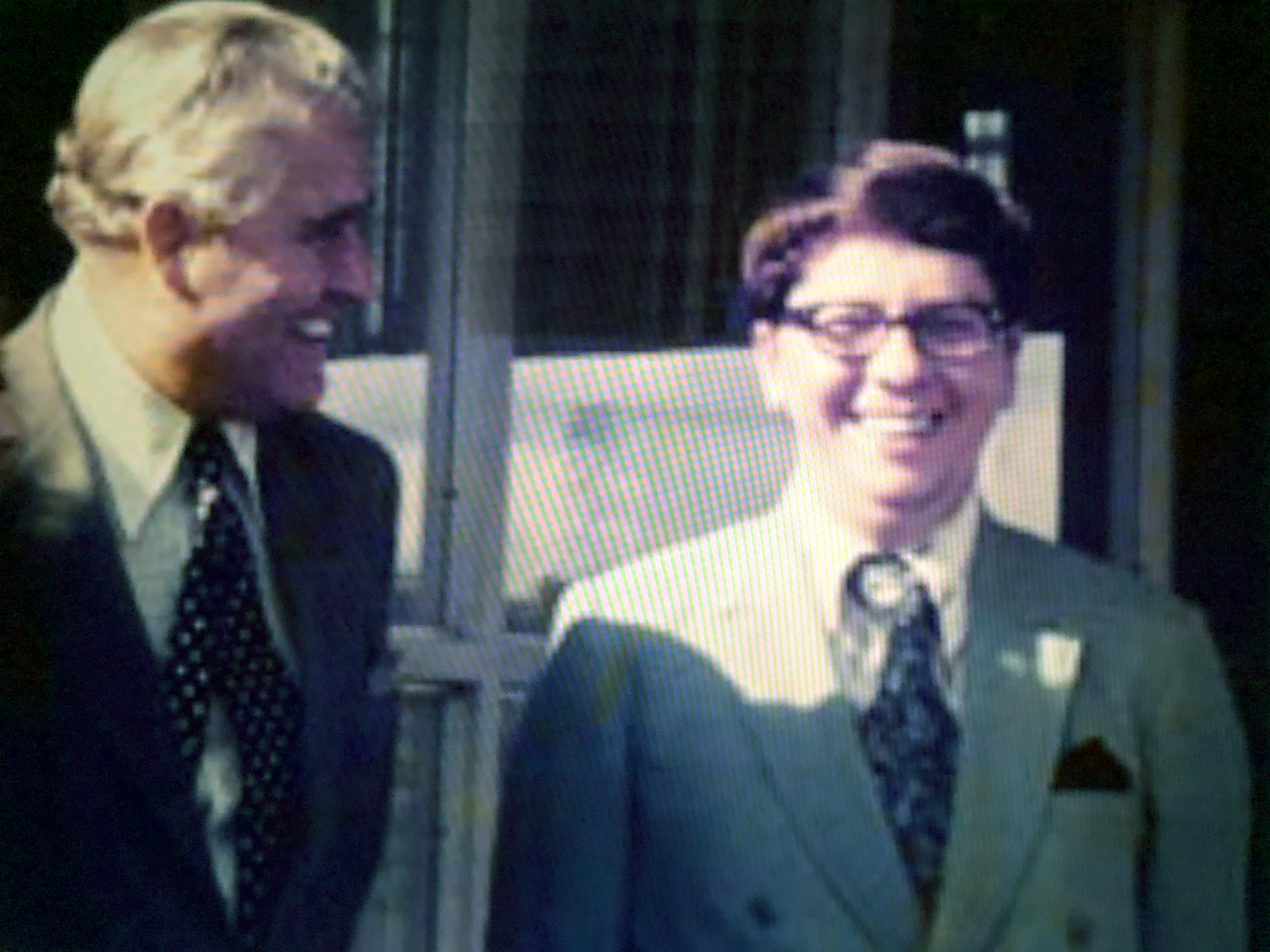
Richard Hoover and Wernher Von Braun

Working at the NASA Marshall Space Flight Center in Huntsville, Alabama, beginning in 1966, Hoover has taken part in astrobiological research carried out there since 1997. In 1998, he participated in two of the astrobiology proposals funded by the newly formed NASA Virtual Astrobiology Institute. He was co-investigator with David McKay (PI) of the NASA Johnson Space Center on the study of biomarkers and microfossils in meteorites, astromaterials and ancient terrestrial rocks, and collaborated with Kenneth Nealson (PI) from NASA Jet Propulsion Laboratory on the investigation of microbial extremophiles from some of the Earth's most hostile environments as related to the co-evolution of planets and biospheres.

Hoover is noted for his early work at NASA on Fraunhofer diffraction, and the development of X-ray/EUV telescopes for solar physics research. He developed the "ATM Experiment S-056 grazing incidence X-ray telescope" and obtained 25,000 solar x-ray images from Skylab, and developed the instrument that obtained the first high resolution X-ray/EUV (X-ray to extreme ultraviolet) images of the Sun ever obtained with a normal incidence multilayer X-ray telescope. He performed research on unicellular algae known as diatoms, and is noted for his discovery of microbial extremophiles from places such as Mono Lake, deep Lake Vostok ice cores, deep sea hydrothermal vents, and the living pleistocene bacterium Carnobacterium pleistocenium isolated from the 32,000-year-old permafrost from Fox Tunnel in Alaska. He organized and co-chaired the NASA/NATO/INTAS sponsored 'Astrobiology Advanced Study Institute' that was held in Chania, Crete in 2002. Hoover retired from NASA in December 2011.

== Microfossils in meteorites ==
Since 1997, Richard B. Hoover has published numerous papers describing controversial evidence and claims for the existence of indigenous microfossils of cyanobacteria and other filamentous microorganisms in the CI1 (Ivuna and Orgueil) and CM2 (Murchison and Murray) carbonaceous meteorites, as well as the Polonnaruwa meteorite.

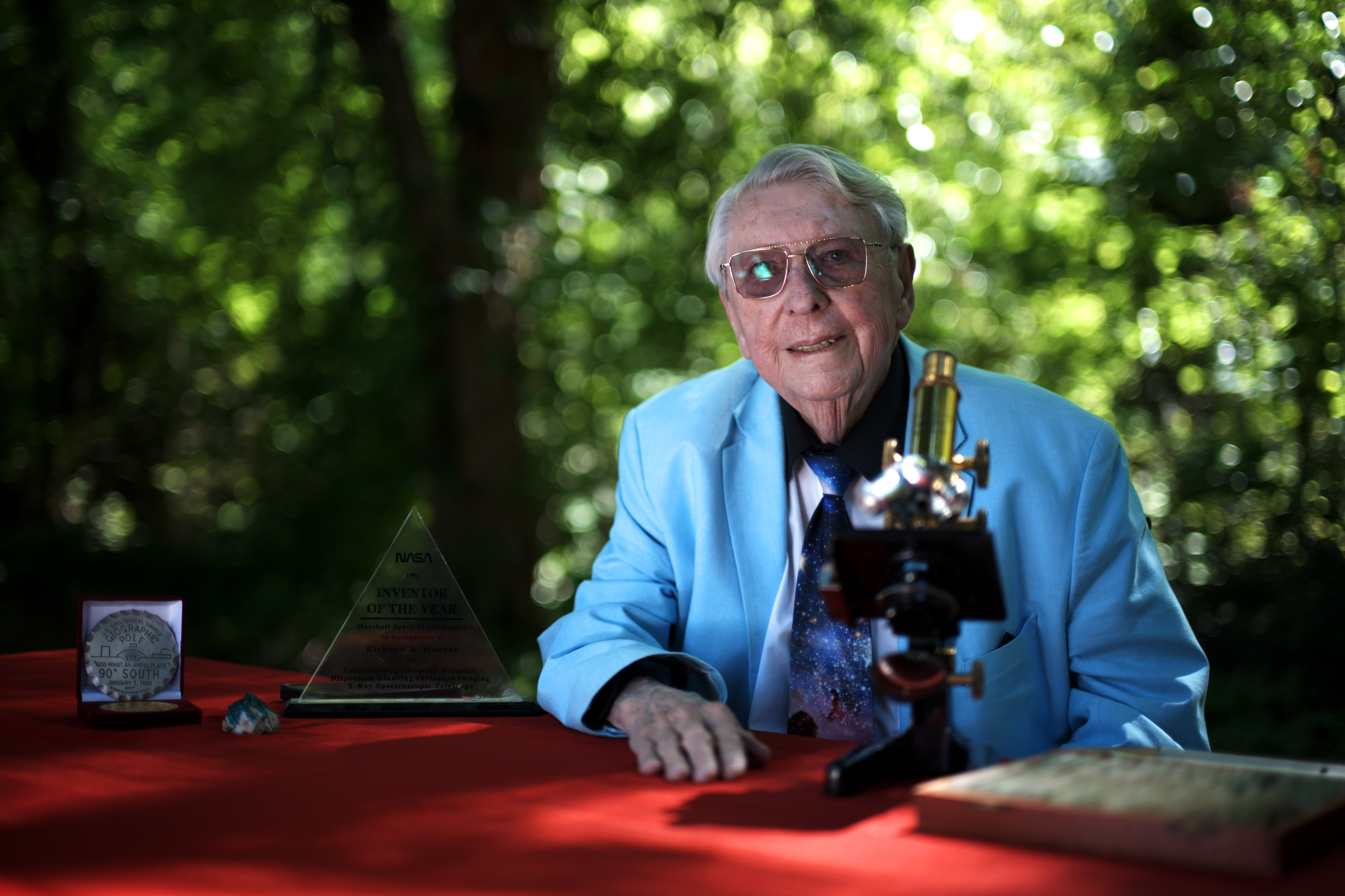
Richard Hoover with MSFC award

Hoover's interpretations and claims for fossilized bacteria in meteorites were published in 1997, 2005, 2007, 2008, 2011, and 2013.

NASA officially distanced itself from Hoover's 2011 claim and his lack of expert peer reviews. A consensus that has emerged from these discussions, and is now seen as a critical requirement, is the demand for further lines of evidence in addition to any morphological data that supports such extraordinary claims. Currently, the scientific consensus is that "morphology alone cannot be used unambiguously as a tool for primitive life detection." Interpretation of morphology is notoriously subjective, and its use alone has led to numerous errors of interpretation.

== Extremophiles ==
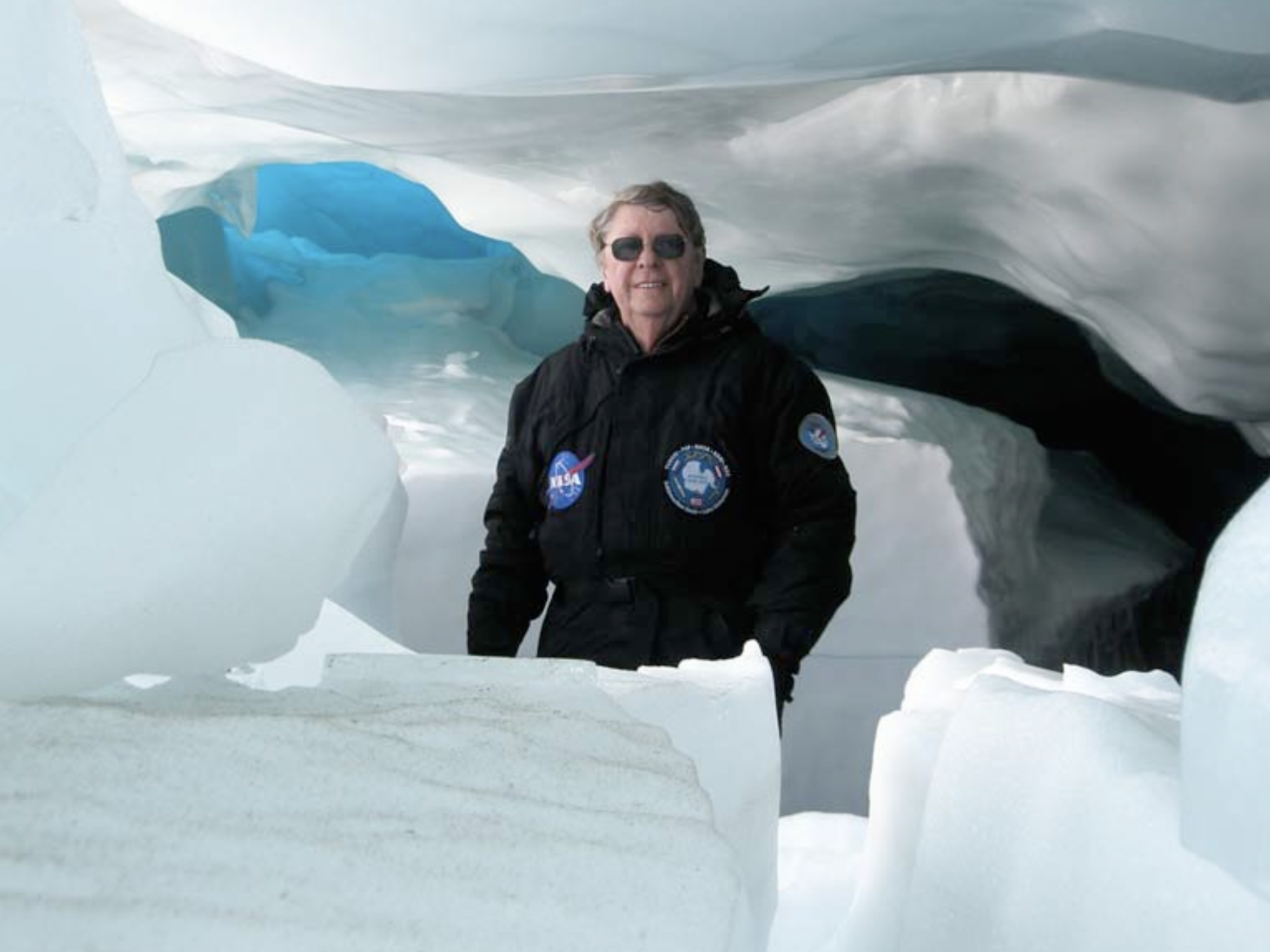
Richard Hoover on an antarctic expedition

Hoover has collected meteorites and microbial extremophiles from Antarctica; novel bacteria from glaciers and permafrost of Antarctica, Patagonia, Siberia, Alaska and from haloalkaline lakes, geysers and volcanoes of California, Alaska, Crete and Hawaii. Hoover has described and published several new species and two new genera of bacteria and archaea: Anaerovirgula and Proteocatella. He has authored four new species of bacteria (Spirochaeta americana, Desulfonatronum thiodismutans, Tindallia californiensis) from Mono Lake; and Carnobacterium pleistocenium that survived for 32,000 years in a frozen Alaskan pond.

== Other ==
Hoover co-directed the NATO Advanced Study Institute on Astrobiology and his book "Perspectives in Astrobiology" was published in 2005. He is a fellow of SPIE and has served on the Boards of Directors of SPIE (1991–2002); the American Association of Engineering Societies (1999–2001) and the Council of Scientific Society Presidents (2002). Richard B. Hoover was 2001 President of SPIE. In 2009, Hoover was awarded the highest honor bestowed by SPIE – the Gold Medal of the Society - "In Recognition for his work X-Ray/EUV Optics and Astrobiology". Hoover retired from NASA in December 2011.
