= Astrovirology =

Study of viruses in a planetary sciences framing

Astrovirology is an emerging subdiscipline of astrobiology which aims to understand the potential role viruses played in the origin and evolution of life on Earth as well as other planets. While most research on extraterrestrial life has focused on the discovery of microbes, recent research has suggested that viral-like beings should be the main focus. The term "astrovirology" was coined in 2013 by Dale Warren Griffin, who highlighted the potential importance of viruses in space exploration. Given their ability to infect nearly every form of life and adapt to a range of environmental conditions, viruses may offer insight into extraterrestrial life.

== Viruses and early life on Earth ==
=== Viruses drive evolution ===
Viruses are a major driving force in evolution; the arms race between viruses and their host, or the Red Queen hypothesis, causes strong evolutionary pressures in both the host and viruses. The host evolves to evade and destroy viruses, while the virus evolves mechanisms to continue infecting the host. Evolution is also influenced by viral horizontal gene transfer. Viral genes can be inserted into the host genome (ex. Retroviruses) and sometimes these genes are evolutionarily favorable. One common example of beneficial horizontal gene transfer in humans is the gene for syncytin, which came from ancient viruses and is important in placenta development.

=== Viruses influence major evolutionary events ===
Though unproven, some virologists posit that viruses may have played an important role in major evolutionary events, including the emergence of a DNA genome from an RNA world, divergence from LUCA to the three domains of life, archaea, bacteria, and eukarya, and development of multicellularity. Emergence of a DNA genome and divergence from LUCA may have been aided by horizontal gene transfer of polymerases and other gene-editing enzymes from viruses. Meanwhile, viral selection pressures could have also aided divergence from LUCA to defend against different viruses, while multicellularity provides greater cell population protection from viruses.

== Viruses and Earth's environment ==
=== Viruses influence biogeochemical cycles ===
Viruses cause nutrient cycling in the ocean via the viral shunt, and up to 25% of the available carbon in the upper ocean is attributed to virus-induced cell lysis.

Around 5% of Earth's oxygen is thought to be produced by cells infected by viruses encoding photosynthetic genes otherwise absent from the cell. For example, some viruses of cyanobacteria contain genes for Photosystem II, which allows those cyanobacteria to photosynthesize and live in a different part of the ocean as their non-infected counterparts. Some viruses encode other metabolic genes that allow new metabolic functions in their host, for example, phosphate, carbon, and sulfur metabolism.

=== Extremophile viruses ===
Viruses can withstand extreme conditions on Earth ranging from the deep-sea hydrothermal vents to arctic permafrost. Viruses have been found in extremely hot, cold, and acidic natural environments, up to 93 °C (199 °F), down to −12 °C (10 °F), and down to pH 1.5. Space has seen to harbor harsher conditions, which includes extreme fluctuations in radiation, temperature, and pressure.

== Viruses in space ==
=== Infectivity in space ===
Viruses including tobacco mosaic virus, poliovirus, and bacteriophage T1 have maintained infectivity after being exposed to space-like conditions including interstellar radiation, low temperature, and low pressure. Further studies are needed to assess the risk of viral hitchhikers, but any virus infecting an organism inside a habitable spacecraft can survive as long as that organism survives.

=== Effect on astronauts ===
Latent viruses such as herpes virus, prevalent in humans, can become reactive during spaceflight due to spaceflight stressors. While astronauts experienced few if any symptoms, the potential for other viruses to become reactivated or more virulent is a substantial threat.

Furthermore, some bacteria (Serratia marcescens) have been found to be more virulent in spaceflight conditions, leading to a question of whether viruses could also become more virulent.

=== Forward contamination potential ===
Limiting forward contamination is critical to be confident in the results of life detection efforts. Bacteria pose a significant contamination challenge in spacecraft assembly clean rooms despite decontamination procedures. However, viruses were found to be present at relatively low levels, based on a metagenomic analysis. Another metagenomic study detected viable human viruses, including herpesvirus and cycloviruses.

=== Back contamination potential ===
Life (and viruses) on other planetary bodies have two important potential origins: from Earth or from a second genesis (life originated on that planet). Ancient viruses could have been transported from Earth to another planetary body, perhaps following a massive meteorite impact or volcanic eruption. If this occurred, these viruses would likely be very biological similar to modern organisms. There may be minimal or no immunity among Earth life against the ancient virus, and whatever organism it can infect may be crippled by its re-introduction.

If extraterrestrial viruses are part of a second genesis, their infectivity of Earth life depends on how they encode their genetic information. While their encoding could be incompatible with Earth life, it is also possible that RNA, DNA, or similar molecules could encode for life in the second genesis. In this case, Earth life may be a suitable host.

== Viruses and Panspermia ==
A long-standing hypothesis of the distribution of life, including viruses, is panspermia, which can be traced all the way back to 5th century Greek philosopher, Anaxagoras. Panspermia suggests that life may have originated elsewhere in the universe and then spread to other planets such as Earth via celestial bodies like meteors, asteroids, or comets. Many geological activities including meteorite crashes and volcanic eruptions could spread "seeds of life" which include dormant viruses, DNA, and RNA. Several mechanisms within panspermia have been proposed for how viruses could possibly survive space's extreme conditions.

=== Mechanisms ===
The most widely accepted form would be lithopanspermia, which focuses on the expulsion of organic material from meteorites crashing onto planetary surfaces. Lithopanspermia is supported by much evidence provided from Martian meteorites, which have been seen to contain organic compounds. Additionally, laboratory simulations have shown that these explosive events could expel viruses and organic matter into space and possibly seeding life there.

Similar to lithopanspermia, the cometary panspermia model developed by Fred Hoyle and Chandra Wickramasinghe proposes that comets are the primary form of transportation and serve as incubators. Comets are rich in materials like water and possess a greater diversity of organic compounds. Research on carbonaceous chondrites may suggest the presence of fossilized microorganisms.

Moving beyond celestial bodies, radiopanspermia, offers an alternative pathway for interspace travel through radiation pressure from stars. This theory was developed in 1903 by Svante Arrhenius and proposes that microscopic particles, like bacteria or viruses, could be constantly propelled by the photons emitted from stars. These photons act similarly to winds pushing a sail, transferring their momentum to the particles and accelerating them throughout space.

=== Limitations ===
Despite the interesting potential for viruses to play a role in the origin of life, several limitations and challenges exist.

One of the biggest challenge for astrovirology lies within detecting viruses within other planets. Due to their submicroscopic size, much of the modern microscopy may not provide the necessary resolution or have the facilities to identify these viral particles.

Transmission electron microscopy (TEM) provides a high resolution power, which makes it a commonly used method for studying the morphology and structure of viruses. The high resolving power allows studies to delve into the nanometer scale. However its use in space is affected by the fluctuations of temperature and pressure, which constrains sample preparation. A surrounding membrane must also be identified for extraterrestrial life detection.

Fluorescence microscopy has shown promise to detect life signatures on Mars by using specific dyes that can bind to certain components of the microorganisms such as cellular membranes or genetic material. However, a major disadvantages of fluorescence microscopy involves false positives, as many mineral samples can naturally fluoresce under different wavelengths. Furthermore, fluorescence microscopy can not obtain detail such as molecular weight, which would limit the depth of analysis for complex compounds.

== Potential biosignatures/detection methods ==
While viruses may or may not be "alive", detection of virions on another planet would be powerful indirect evidence for life. The following methods could offer biosignatures with varying levels of usefulness:

- Scanning electron microscopy: SEM has potential to be integrated onto a spacecraft, but currently lacks the resolution to detect virion structure.
- Transmission electron microscopy: TEM can visualize virion structure, but the imaging procedure is more difficult than SEM, and so integration onto an automated spacecraft seems unlikely.
- Lipid detection in rock: Enveloped viruses may be identifiable via this method.
- Chemical identification: Specific chemicals can be identified via GC-MS, NMR, or FTIR spectroscopy.
- Virus-mediated event: Large-scale lysis of a given host cell can cause easily detectable effects. For example, the chalk deposits in the white cliffs of Dover are caused by large-scale lysis of algae, which could have been virus-induced.

== Proposed and current life detection missions ==
Astrovirologists have called for proposed missions to sample the water plumes of Enceladus and/or Europa for viruses. Others have called for virus detection as part of Mars rover missions like the Rosalind Franklin rover. However, given the lack of validated biosignatures to detect viruses in situ, sample return to Earth has been recommended, which would allow use of TEM and other detection methods requiring complex sample preparation and/or large equipment. The Mars 2020 Perseverance rover has equipment to drill regolith samples and store them for sample return on a future Mars mission.
