= The Beyond =

The Beyond may refer to:

== Film ==
- The Beyond (1981 film), a 1981 Italian horror film
- The Beyond (2018 film), a 2018 science-fiction film

== Music ==
- The Beyond (album), an album by Cult of Luna
- The Beyond (band), a UK progressive metal band
- "The Beyond" (song), a 2020 single by Luna Sea

== Literature ==
- A fictional region of space in the Demon Princes novels by Jack Vance
- A fictional "Zone of Thought" in the novel A Fire Upon the Deep by Vernor Vinge, and its prequel, A Deepness in the Sky

== See also ==
- Beyond (disambiguation)
