= High chair =

Child's chair for eating

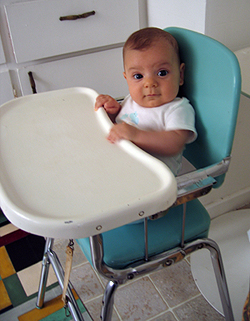
A 1957 model high chair by Cosco

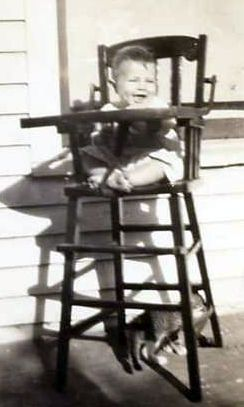
Baby in wooden high chair, about 1935

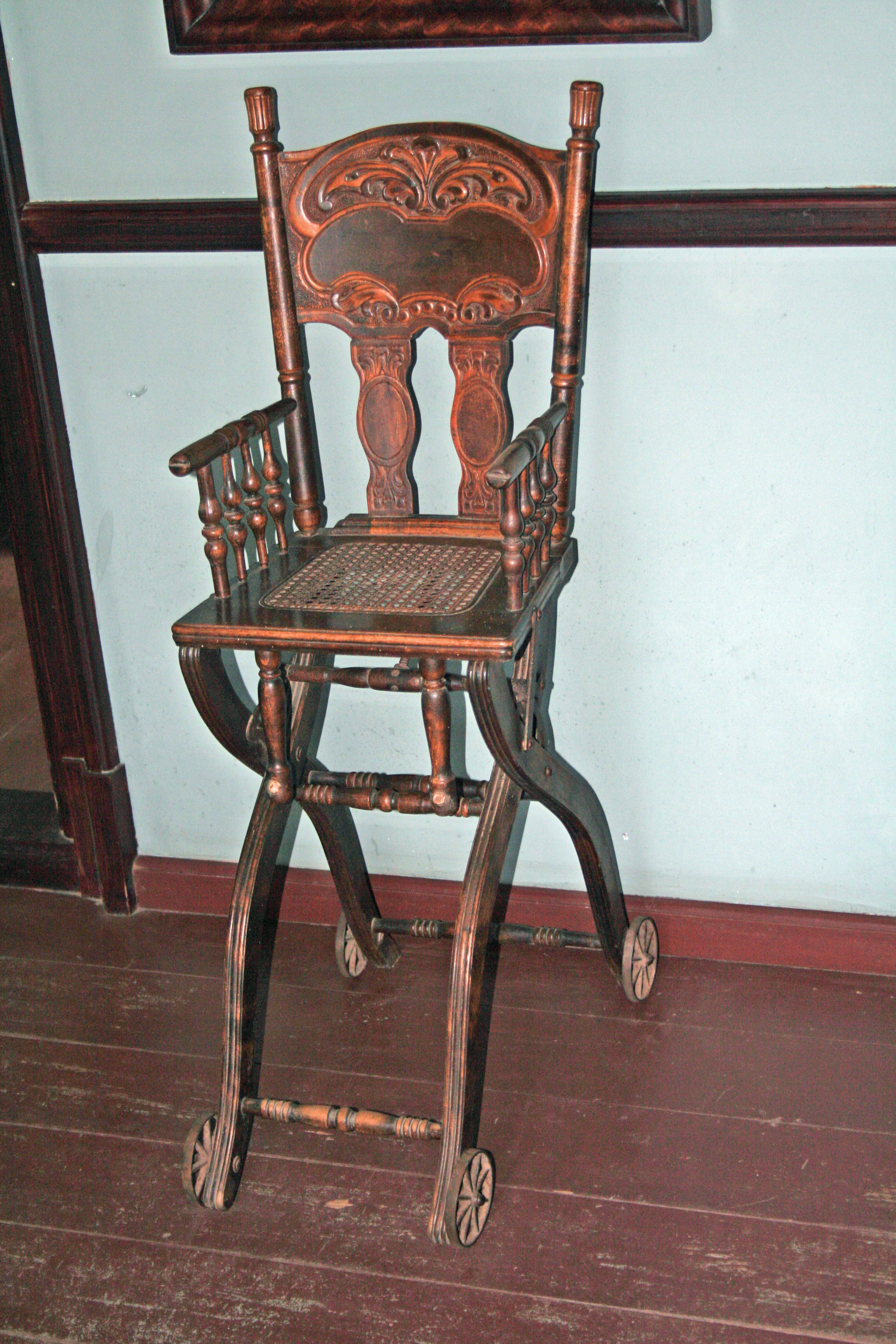
High chair – Open-air museum Cloppenburg, Germany

A high chair is a piece of furniture used for feeding older babies and younger toddlers. The seat is raised a fair distance from the ground, so that a person of adult height may spoon-feed the child comfortably from a standing position. It often has a wide base to increase stability. There is a tray which is attached to the arms of the high chair, which allows the adult to place the food on it for either the child to pick up and eat or for the food to be spoon-fed to them.

A booster chair for children is meant to be used with a regular chair to boost the height of a child sufficiently. Some boosters are a simple monolithic piece of plastic. Others are more complex and are designed to fold up and include a detachable tray.

A variation is a seat with forward-extending arms that can be hooked or clamped onto a tabletop, allowing the child to sit directly at the table without the need for a conventional high chair. When not in use, the seat can be detached and stored.

== Safety ==
High chairs can result in child-related accidents. The EU standard EN 14988:2017+A1:2020 has been published in 2020 by the European Committee for Standardization.
