= Beyond (book) =

Non-fiction work by Chris Impey

Beyond: Our Future in Space
- Hardcover edition
- Authors: Chris Impey
- Language: English
- Subject: Space travel
- Genre: Non-fiction
- Publisher: W. W. Norton & Company
- Publication date: April 13, 2015 (hardcover)
- Publication place: United States
- Media type: Print (hardcover and paperback) and electronic
- Pages: 336
- ISBN: 978-0-393-23930-0
- Preceded by: Humble before the Void

Beyond: Our Future in Space is a non-fiction book by astronomer and professor Chris Impey that discusses the history of space travel and the future trajectory of human exploration of space. Impey's third popular science book for Norton was published as a hardcover in 2015.

== Summary ==
Beyond: Our Future in Space is a non-fiction book by astronomy professor Chris Impey on the history and future of human exploration of space. The book starts with a discussion of the human urge to explore, which led us to fan out over the Earth soon after leaving Africa. This urge may have a gene associated with it. This is followed by a recounting of the Space Race of the middle of the 20th century, driven by fierce superpower rivalry between the United States and the former Soviet Union. Early milestones in the history of space travel are summarized, along with the feats and tribulations of human (and animal) space explorers. The "club" of those who have been in Earth orbit is still very select, less than 550, compared to ten times more people who have stood on the summit of Mount Everest.

The second section of the book considered the recent doldrums of NASA, where the United States has been unable to launch an astronaut into orbit for over five years. Then it shifts to new opportunities being opened up by the private space companies. Space entrepreneurs are taking risks and investing heavily in a future of Space tourism. Those highlighted include Burt Rutan, Richard Branson, Elon Musk, and Peter Diamandis. Space travel is still bound by red tape and subject to the implacable laws of physics as expressed in the rocket equation. Meanwhile, a new space race is underway among governments, as China, India, and Japan develop their technologies and programs.

Beyond then turns to the potential for living and working in space, and the place in the Solar System where we might establish a permanent base. Economic models suggest that a viable space activity can be based on recreation, scientific research, and mining. In addition, there is an enormous amount of habitable real estate revealed by discoveries of extrasolar planets, but the difficulty of traveling beyond the Solar System will keep this beyond reach for a long time. More ambitious approaches include terraforming, where an entire planet or moon is altered to allow human habitation.

The final section of the book turns to the far future, where we might one day leave the planet and the Solar System. This will require ambitious new propulsion systems, capable of accelerating a payload to a few percent of the speed of light. The potential of exploration by sentient nanobots is considered, along with the obstacles to achieving teleportation. At the end of the book, the prospects of finding intelligent, technological civilizations elsewhere are discussed. Based on recent estimated of 20 billion habitable worlds in the Milky Way, it's likely that such civilizations exist and some of them are likely to have developed capabilities far beyond our own. We are just venturing off-world for the first time, with a future in space ahead of us.

== Reception ==
Beyond was a starred selection by Publishers Weekly, with a review that concludes "With vivid writing that skillfully walks the line between visionary and pragmatic, Impey finds equal opportunity for both humans and robotic explorers on a journey that could not only teach us about new worlds, but how to be better caretakers of this one." The book also had a good review in Kirkus Reviews. The Arizona NPR affiliate devoted segment to the book and a general discussion of space travel. Noted astronomer and science popularizer Neil deGrasse Tyson said "Chris Impey manages to rejuvenate the 'Space is Our Future' feeling that pervaded human culture half a century ago." Poet and write Diane Ackerman also endorsed the book, saying "Impey’s space-faring vision really shines in this captivating tour of the deepest past and the distant future. It's a marvelous book to curl up with on a starry night and let your mind roam through the halls of possibility."
