= How It Began =

Book by Chris Impey

How It Began: A Time Traveler's Guide to the Universe
- Author: Chris Impey
- Subject: Astronomy
- Genre: Non-fiction
- Publisher: W. W. Norton & Company
- Publication date: January 14, 2012 (paperback)
- Media type: Print (hardcover and paperback) and electronic
- Pages: 448
- ISBN: 978-0393343861
- Preceded by: How It Ends: From You to the Universe
- Followed by: Dreams of Other Worlds

How It Began: A Time Traveler's Guide to the Universe is a non-fiction book by the astronomer Chris Impey that discusses the history of the universe, with chapters ranging from the proximate universe to within an iota of the Big Bang. It was published as a hardcover by W. W. Norton & Company in 2012 and as a paperback in 2013. It is actually the prequel to his 2010 book How it Ends: From You to the Universe, which talks about how everything, from individual humans, to the human species, to the Earth, and finally, the universe, might one day end in the future.

== Summary ==
How It Began: A Time Traveler's Guide to the Universe is a non-fiction book by astronomy professor Chris Impey on the origins of everything from the Moon to the universe. The finite speed of light and the vastness of space turn modern large telescopes into time machines and astronomers into armchair time travelers. Looking out in space is looking back in time. Each chapter has vignettes that place the reader in increasingly unfamiliar physical situations that are increasingly unfamiliar. How It Began has an associated web site containing source material on each major topic.

The first third of the book deals with the proximate universe. The journey starts with the Moon and its formation from an impact with the infant Earth. Next stop is the outer Solar System and the process by particles of dust growing into planets. The nearest star is the place where star formation is considered, followed by the Orion Nebula, where young stars are forming at a furious rate. The last stop in the nearby universe is the Galactic Center, the center of the Milky Way galaxy, site of a black hole four million times the mass of the Sun.

The second third of the book examines the remote universe. Andromeda is seen as it was before humans evolved on the plains of Africa, and galaxies are all seen over time spans that dwarf our existence. The next stop is the massive Coma Cluster of galaxies, a swarm of thousands of galaxies bound by invisible dark matter. This section continues with a visit to galaxies that created their stars long before the Earth formed and it finished with the time when stars first congealed out of gas in the expanding universe, 200 million years after the Big Bang.

The last third of the book ventures into the alien universe. The microwave background radiation is a relic of time when stable atoms first formed and the "fog lifted" in the infant universe. Reaching back to the time when the universe was as hot as the core of a star, the Big Bang is manifested in the creation of helium. The last chapters of the book cross into the realm of speculation, with descriptions the tiny asymmetry in the forces of nature that led to a tiny excess of matter over antimatter, the early exponential expansion that flattened space-time, and the idea of the universe as one quantum event among many.

== Reception ==
How It Began received strong reviews. Writing in the Wall Street Journal, Manjit Kumar wrote "In clear, enthusiastic and occasionally lyrical prose, Mr. Impey takes the reader on a mind-blowing tour back through eons, stopping along the way to explain the formation of the solar system, the birth and death of stars, white dwarfs, supernovas, spiral galaxies, cosmic inflation, string theory, black holes and M-theory". Maclean's magazine notes "With Impey flexing his creative writing muscles, How It Began could almost be a science fiction novel. But when he describes what we really do know about the universe—and questions we're grappling with—it's even more incredible than anything a science fiction writer could dream up". Science fiction author Ben Bova said "Chris Impey has achieved the near-impossible: an accurate, up-to-date account of 'the state of the universe' that is told in gripping human terms. A great achievement and a 'must-read' book." Kirkus Reviews concluded its review with "An astute tour of the cosmos by a skillful teacher."
