= CI1 fossils =

Alleged evidence of microfossils in meteorites

CI1 fossils refer to alleged morphological evidence of microfossils found in five CI1 carbonaceous chondrite meteorite fall: Alais, Orgueil, Ivuna, Tonk and Revelstoke. The research was published in March 2011 in the fringe Journal of Cosmology by Richard B. Hoover, an engineer. However, NASA distanced itself from Hoover's claim and his lack of expert peer-reviews.

== Findings ==
Hoover's team used Environmental (ESEM) and Field Emission Scanning Electron Microscopy (FESEM) to analyze the meteorite samples, studying internal surfaces. Hoover also produced electron micrographs which he believes resemble the shape of trichomic cyanobacteria and other trichomic prokaryotes such as the filamentous sulfur bacteria. For comparison, Hoover compared the samples to those of terrestrial minerals and biological materials. Hoover concludes from these results that the CI1 fossils are indigenous to the samples.

The claims were initially submitted to the International Journal of Astrobiology, which rejected the paper, but were eventually published by the fringe Journal of Cosmology. NASA distanced itself from Hoover's claims, and the claims were debunked soon after publication.

== See also ==
- Glossary of meteoritics
- Panspermia
