= Beyond (Paranoia Press) =

Science-fiction role-playing game supplement

- Designers: Donald P. Rapp
- Publishers: Paranoia Press
- Publication: 1981; 44 years ago
- Genres: Science-fiction
- Systems: Classic Traveller

Beyond is a 1981 tabletop role-playing game supplement for Traveller, written by Donald P. Rapp, and published by Paranoia Press.

== Contents ==
Beyond is a Traveller supplement that describes the "Beyond" sector, and the planets contained within its sixteen subsectors. In addition to the book, a map of the sector is included. Information about each planet in the sector includes name, type of planet, and trade indicators, as well as pertinent shipping lines, alien races, prominent persons and political bodies.

== Publication history ==
Beyond was written by Donald P. Rapp and was published in 1981 by Paranoia Press as a digest-sized 32-page book with a map.

== Reception ==
In the August 1981 edition of The Space Gamer (Issue No. 42), William A. Barton thought this supplement was a good addition to the Traveller universe, saying, "Beyond will prove to be a fascinating area for any Travellers to visit. Every devoted player should add it to his Traveller collection."

In the February 1982 edition of Dragon (Issue 58), Tony Watson thought Beyond was "nicely done and well thought out", but questioned the need for it: "Subsectors are available from other sources, and one wonders if more are really needed."
