= Coldwater =

Coldwater or Cold Water may refer to:

== Places ==
=== Canada ===
- Coldwater, Ontario
- Coldwater First Nation, a Nlaka'pamux First Nations government in British Columbia
  - Coldwater 1, also known as Coldwater Indian Reserve No. 1, the main reserve of that First Nation, near Merritt
- Coldwater River Provincial Park, British Columbia

=== United States ===
- Coldwater, Georgia
- Coldwater, Kansas
- Coldwater, Michigan
- Coldwater Spring, historic camp and natural site in Minnesota
- Coldwater, Mississippi
- Coldwater, Missouri
- Coldwater, Ohio
- Coldwater, Texas (disambiguation), three places is the state
- Coldwater, West Virginia
- Coldwater Township, Butler County, Iowa
- Coldwater Township, Branch County, Michigan
- Coldwater Township, Isabella County, Michigan

== Books, films, and TV ==
- Cold Water (film), 1994 French film written and directed by Olivier Assayas
- Coldwater, the alternative title of the 2005 film Sabah
- Coldwater (film), 2013 American motion picture
- Coldwater (TV series), 2026 British TV series
- Coldwater, 2001 novel by Mardi McConnochie

== Music ==
- Cold Water (album), 2003 debut album by Mia Dyson
- "Cold Water" (song), by Major Lazer
- "Cold Water", song by Railroad Earth from The Black Bear Sessions
- "Cold Water", song by Matthew Good from Chaotic Neutral
- "Cold Water", song by Landshapes
- "Cold Water", song by Protest the Hero from Pacific Myth
- "Cold Water", song by Damien Rice from his 2002 debut album O

== See also ==
- Coldwater Canyon in Los Angeles
- Coldwater Covered Bridge in Alabama
- Coldwater Creek (disambiguation)
- Coldwater fish, aquarium fish that prefer cooler water temperatures
- Coldwater High School (disambiguation)
- Coldwater Lake State Park, Branch County, Michigan
- Coldwater River (disambiguation)
- Cold Water Spring State Preserve in Iowa and Minnesota
- Cold Waters (disambiguation)
