= Coldest winter =

Coldest winter may refer to:

- The coldest winter, see List of weather records
- The Coldest Winter: America and the Korean War (2007 book), a 2007 book about the Korean War
- "Coldest Winter" (song), 2008
- The Coldest Winter (comics), a sequel to the graphic novel The Coldest City

== Other uses ==
- The Coldest Winter in Peking (1981 film)
- The Coldest Winter Ever (1999 novel)

== See also ==
- Coldest place (disambiguation)
- Cold (disambiguation)
- Winter (disambiguation)
