= Coldest city =

Coldest city may refer to:

- The Coldest City (2012 comic), Cold War spy story graphic novel set in Berlin, Germany
- The Coldest City (film), former name of the 2017 film based on the eponymous comic, which was renamed to "Atomic Blonde" prior to release

== Cities ==
- The coldest city, see List of weather records
  - Yakutsk, Russia; coldest major city in winter
  - Helsinki, Finland; coldest city to host the Summer Olympics

== See also ==
- Pole of Cold
- City (disambiguation)
- Cold (disambiguation)
