= Coldwater River (Michigan) =

Coldwater River is the name of three streams in the U.S. state of Michigan:

- Coldwater River (Branch County)
- Coldwater River (Western Michigan)
- Coldwater River (Isabella County)

== See also ==
- Coldwater River (disambiguation)
