= Cool Water =

Cool Water may refer to:

== Music ==
- "Cool Water" (song), a song by Bob Nolan
- "Cool, Cool Water", a song by the Beach Boys
- Cool Water (album), an album by Caravan
- "Cool Water", a song by Talking Heads from the album Naked

== Other ==
- Cool Water (perfume), a perfume brand

== See also ==
- Water cooling
- Water cooler
- Coldwater (disambiguation)
