= Confidence of Life Detection Scale =

Biosignature significance scale

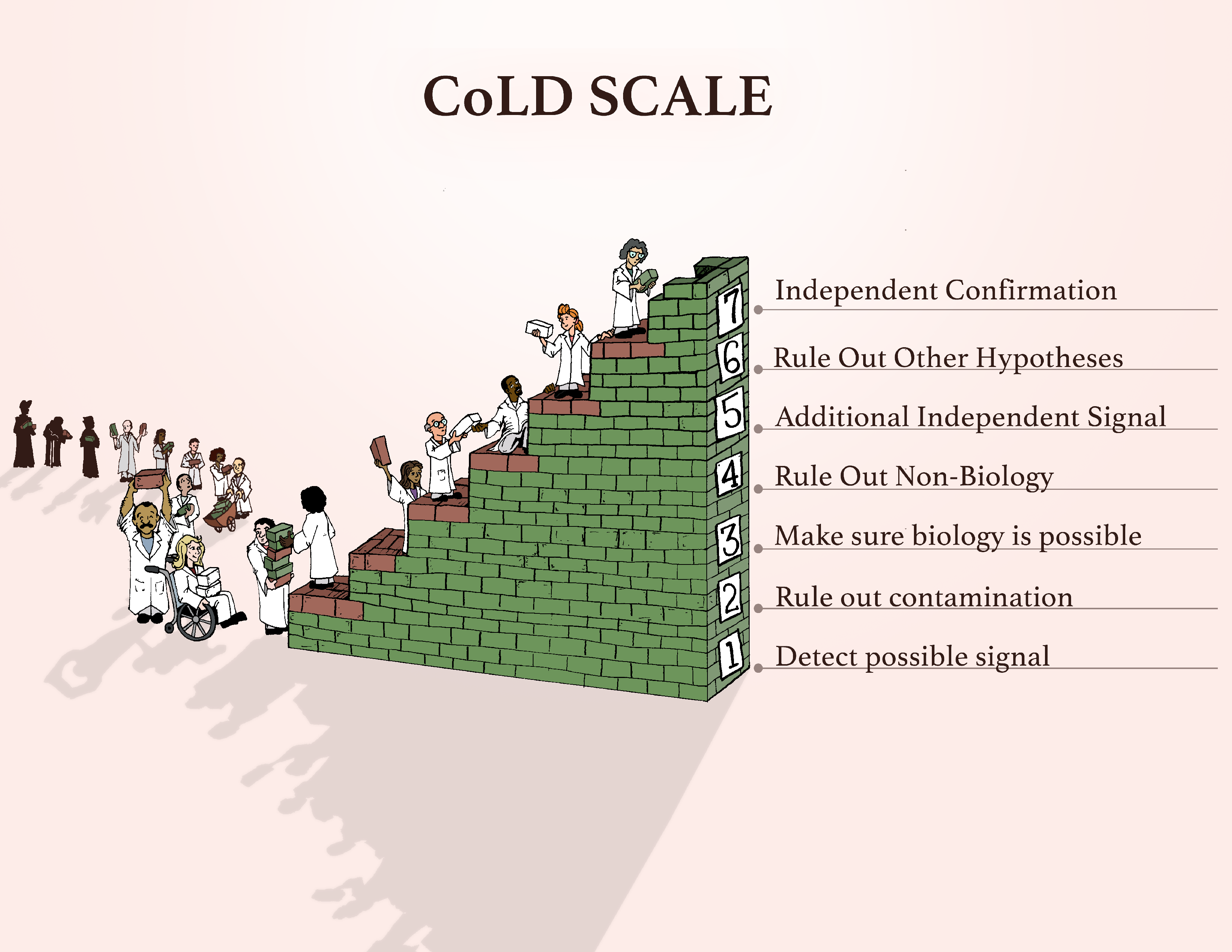
Confidence of Life Detection Scale graphic

The Confidence of Life Detection scale (CoLD scale) is a framework that is proposed by NASA scientists for communicating the confidence that a set of scientific observations constitutes evidence of extraterrestrial life, The scale consists of seven levels from initial detection of a possible signal to independently confirmed evidence of life. The scale was introduced in a 2021 paper published in Nature by a team led by NASA's chief scientist, James Green. It builds upon an earlier framework called the Ladder of Life Detection, published in 2018 in the journal Astrobiology by Marc Neveu and colleagues. The CoLD scale has been compared to the Torino scale, which rates the danger of asteroid impacts, and to NASA's technology readiness level system, which tracks how mature technology is from concept to proven hardware.

== Background ==
NASA's "working definition of life" is "self-sustaining chemical system capable of Darwinian evolution". As of 2025, the only NASA mission designed to look for life was the Viking program to Mars, launched in 1976. Per Neveu et al.:

If taken independently, some of the measurements made during the experiments performed by Viking could be interpreted as demonstrating the presence of metabolic activity. However, taken together with a null result on a chemical measurement of life's organic building blocks, they cannot exclude the conclusion that life was absent in the Viking samples.

The search for biosignatures beyond earth has a history of ambiguous findings and premature claims. In 1996, NASA scientists announced that the Mars meteorite Allan Hills 84001 appeared to contain microscopic fossils of ancient Martian life, prompting President Bill Clinton to make a public statement. However, analysis by the broader scientific community found that the features could be explained through non-biological processes. More recently, a 2020 report of phosphine in the atmosphere of Venus generated a lot of speculations about possible life, but the detection itself was later called into question. These episodes highlighted a strong need for a new standardized way to check if preliminary findings related to life detection without creating misleading expectations and public chaos.

Prior to the CoLD scale, the ladder of Life Detection established eight criteria that a life detection claim must satisfy to be deemed convincing. The criteria states, the measurement must be sufficiently sensitive, contamination free, and repeatable. The features must be detectable, preserved and reliably different from expected abiotic signals. The features must be compatible with known life, and a biological interpretation but be considered as a last resort after all other explanations have been exhausted. The ladder framework was designed for mission planners and scientists, whereas the CoLD scale was intended as a broader communication tool for scientists, journalists and the general public to standardize life detection findings.

== Description of the scale ==
The CoLD scale consists of seven levels representing increasing confidence that an observation is evidence of life beyond earth. At its lowest level, The scale begins with the initial detection of a possible biosignature, such as a chemical signal or physical matter that could be of biological origin. The next level requires ruling out contamination from earth based sources, demonstrating that the observed environment could support Biology. The upper levels require independent detection of additional biosignatures by separate instruments or missions, followed by ruling out alternative hypotheses for the new observations. Finally at the last level where Independent follow-up observations have confirmed the biological activity in the same environment.

The scale's maker proposed that such a framework could help set expectations and create value by identifying incremental scientific progress in this area. Also making clear that false starts and dead ends are normal parts of the scientific process. Green envisioned that the scale could eventually be adopted by scientific journals and funding agencies, with reviewers requiring authors of any life detection claim to specify which level of the CoLD scale the claim is at. This information can be used to prioritize missions designed to advance to the next level.

The scale has seven steps:

1. Detect possible signal
2. Rule out contamination
3. Make sure biology is possible
4. Rule out non-biology
5. Find an additional independent signal
6. Rule out other hypotheses
7. Independent confirmation

== Development and community response ==
The CoLD scale was proposed in October 2021 in Nature by James Green, Tori Hoehler, Marc Neveu, Shawn Domagal-Goldman, Daniella Scalice, and Mary Voytek. The authors explicitly described the scale as a proof of concept level framework and "the beginning of an important dialogue" rather than a definite standard that is set in stone. The scientific community is encouraged to refine their approach and build upon it.

In July 2021, shortly before the paper's publication, NASA's Network for Life Detection (NfoLD) and Nexus for Exoplanet System Science (NExSS) research coordination networks hosted a joint workshop on biosignature standards of evidence, attended by hundreds of leading scientists. The participants of that supported the development of more rigorous communication protocols for life-detection findings. The National Academies of Sciences, Engineering, and Medicine also conducted an independent review of the workshop's report at NASA's request. Furthering the point that more work is required in this area to support accurate life detection.

== Criticism ==
The CoLD scale has received criticism from scientists who question its utility and potential for misuse. In a 2023 correspondence in Nature Astronomy Adrian Lenardic and colleagues at Rice University argued that the scale was "an inapt and easily abused tool that will do little to address the misleading terminology and sensational narratives that plague both public and scientific communications from the astrobiology community." They argued that the real problem lies in the imprecise and exaggerated language used by scientists and the media, such as terms like "super earth" and "earth 2.0", and that assigning a number cannot correct misinformation communicated through misleading words.

Separately, a 2023 paper in Astrobiology by Peter Vickers and colleagues raised the "problem of unconceived alternatives" noting that the scale requires ruling out non biological explanations but cannot account for explanations that scientists have not yet imagined. Since we are talking about extraterrestrial life there are endless possibilities about the kinds of signals they can provide us. Green and the original authors responded in a 2024 Nature Astronomy correspondence, reiterating that the CoLD scale was intended as a starting point for this domain and emphasizing its value in structuring incremental progress in life detection science.

== Application to Mars ==
In September 2025, NASA applied the CoLD scale in its announcement regarding the Cheyava Falls rock on Mars, discovered by the Perseverance rover in Jezero crater in July 2024. A peer reviewed paper published in Nature reported that the rock's "Sapphire Canyon" sample contained organic carbon, iron phosphate (vivianite), and iron sulfide (greigite) arranged in a specific "leopard spot" pattern. Mineral characteristics that on Earth are commonly linked to microbial metabolic activity. NASA classified the finding as a potential biosignature, putting it at the lowest levels of the CoLD scale. A detection of a possible signal for which non-biological explanations have not yet been fully excluded, but moving to the next levels of the CoLD scale would require laboratory analysis of the sample on Earth, as planned under the Mars sample Return Campaign.
