= Cold Waters =

Cold Waters may refer to:

- Cold Waters (album), an album by South African rapper PdotO
- Cold Waters (video game), a 2017 submarine simulator game by Killerfish Games

== See also ==
- Cold Water (disambiguation)
