= Cold River =

Cold River may refer to:

== Streams ==
- Cold River (Maine–New Hampshire), a tributary of the Saco River
- Cold River (Bearcamp River tributary), a tributary of the Bearcamp River in New Hampshire
- Cold River (Connecticut River tributary), a tributary of the Connecticut River in New Hampshire
- Cold River (New York), a tributary of the Raquette River
- Cold River (Vermont), a tributary of Otter Creek
- Cold River (Saskatchewan), a tributary of Beaver River in Saskatchewan, Canada

== Other ==
- "Cold River", a song by a-ha from their 1990 album East of the Sun, West of the Moon

== See also ==
- Coldwater River (disambiguation)
- Cold (disambiguation)
