= Cold (disambiguation) =

Cold is the presence of low temperature, especially in the atmosphere.

Cold or COLD may also refer to:

== Medicine ==
- Chest cold, a short-term inflammation of the airways (bronchi) of the lungs
- Chronic obstructive lung disease, a type of progressive lung disease
- Common cold, a viral infectious disease of the upper respiratory system

== Arts, entertainment and media ==
=== Music ===
==== Groups ====
- Cold (band), a post-grunge band
- The Cold (rock band), a new wave band

==== Albums ====
- Cold (Cold album), 1998
- Cold (Lycia album), 1996
- Cold (mixtape), 2013 by James Ferraro
- Coldness (album), 2004 by power metal band Kotipelto
- The Cold (album), 2010 by thrash metal band Flotsam And Jetsam

==== Songs ====
- "Cold" (Annie Lennox song), 1992
- "Cold" (BigXthaPlug song), 2025
- "Cold" (Chris Stapleton song), 2020
- "Cold" (Crossfade song), 2004
- "Cold" (Deep Obsession song), 1999
- "Cold" (Five Finger Death Punch song), 2013
- "Cold" (Kanye West song), 2012
- "Cold" (Korn song), 2019
- "Cold" (Maroon 5 song), 2017
- "Cold" (Maxwell song), 2009
- "Cold" (O'G3NE song), 2015
- "Cold" (Static-X song), 2002
- "Cold" (Stormzy song), 2017
- "Cold" (Tears for Fears song), 1993
- "Cold (But I'm Still Here)", a 2005 song by Evans Blue
- "Cold", by At the Gates from the album Slaughter of the Soul
- "Cold", by Before the Dawn from the album Soundscape of Silence
- "Cold", by Craig David
- "Cold", by the Cure from the album Pornography, 1982
- "Cold", by Jace Chan from the album Processing, 2021
- "Cold", by James Blunt from the album Once Upon a Mind
- "Cold", by Jessie Murph from the album That Ain't No Man That's the Devil
- "Cold", by John Gary
- "Cold", by Julian Lennon from the album Photograph Smile
- "Cold", by Lacuna Coil from In a Reverie
- "Cold", by Matchbox Twenty from the album More Than You Think You Are
- "Cold", by Neffex, 2018
- "Cold", by Nicole Scherzinger
- "Cold", by Omnium Gatherum from the album The Burning Cold
- "Cold", by Post Malone from the album Stoney
- "Cold", by Rae Morris from the album Unguarded
- "The Cold", by Ryan Adams from the album Prisoner: End of the World Edition
- "Cold", by Siobhan Fahey from the album Songs from the Red Room
- "Cold", by Stabbing Westward from the EP Dead and Gone
- "Cold", by Times of Grace from the album Songs of Loss and Separation

=== Film ===
- Cold (film), a 2013 Irish film by and with Eoin Macken

=== Television ===
- "Cold" (Law & Order: Special Victims Unit)
- "The Cold" (Modern Family), an episode from the TV series Modern Family
- "The Cold", an episode of season 7 of The West Wing

=== Other fiction ===
- Cold (novel), a 1996 James Bond novel by John Gardner
- Captain Cold, American animated supervillain

== Other uses ==
- Thermodynamic beta, the reciprocal of thermodynamic temperature, is sometimes referred to as coldness.
- Computer Output to Laser Disc, a method of data storage and retrieval
- Confidence of Life Detection Scale (CoLD), used by NASA's astrobiologists

== See also ==
- Cold River (disambiguation)
- Cold War (disambiguation)
- Colder (disambiguation)
- Coldplay, an English pop/rock band
