= Biosignature =

Substance providing scientific evidence of past or present life

A biosignature is a phenomenon that can be explained by biological processes where all possible abiotic causes of this phenomenon have been eliminated. This term is mainly used in the field of astrobiology in the search for past or present extraterrestrial life, from planets and moons in the Solar System to exoplanets. Candidate biosignatures strongly indicate some of the earliest known life forms, aid studies of the origin of life on Earth as well as the possibility of life on Mars, Venus, and elsewhere in the universe.

== History ==
The term "biosignature" and its definition have evolved over time. In the 1960s, the phrase "life detection" was used as seen in two Nature papers "A physical basis for life detection experiments," by James. E. Lovelock (1965) and "Signs of Life: Criterion-system of exobiology," by Joshua Lederberg (1965). In 1973, Joon H. Rho used the term "biomarker" in his paper, "A search for porphyrin biomarkers in nonesuch shale and extraterrestrial samples" to describe a fossil organic compound that can be traced back to a specific organism. In medicine, biomarker (medicine) has a different definition. In 1995, the term biosignature was first used by the NASA Exobiology Program office (now the NASA Astrobiology Program) in "An Exobiological Strategy for Mars Exploration." The term has since become widely used in astrobiology.

The definition of "biosignature" continued to be refined. In 2003, it was described as an object, substance, and/or pattern that unequivocally was originated through a biological process. By 2018, the definition had broadened to a substance or phenomenon that presents evidence of life. In 2023, the astrobiology community further refined the concept, agreeing that a biosignature is a phenomenon that can only be explained by biological processes, with all plausible abiotic explanations having been considered and eliminated.

== Types ==
Biosignatures can be grouped into ten broad categories:

1. Isotope patterns: Isotopic evidence or patterns that require biological processes.
2. Chemistry: Chemical features that require biological activity.
3. Organic matter: Organics formed by biological processes.
4. Minerals: Minerals or biomineral-phases whose composition and/or morphology indicate biological activity (e.g., biomagnetite).
5. Microscopic structures and textures: Biologically-formed cements, microtextures, microfossils, and films.
6. Macroscopic physical structures and textures: Structures that indicate microbial ecosystems, biofilms (e.g., stromatolites), or fossils of larger organisms.
7. Temporal variability: Variations in time of atmospheric gases, reflectivity, or macroscopic appearance that indicates life's presence.
8. Surface reflectance features: Large-scale reflectance features due to biological pigments.
9. Atmospheric gases: Gases formed by metabolic processes, which may be present on a planet-wide scale.
10. Technosignatures: Signatures that indicate a technologically advanced civilization.

== Viability ==
Determining whether an observed feature is a true biosignature is complex. There are three criteria that a potential biosignature must meet to be considered viable for further research: Reliability, survivability, and detectability.

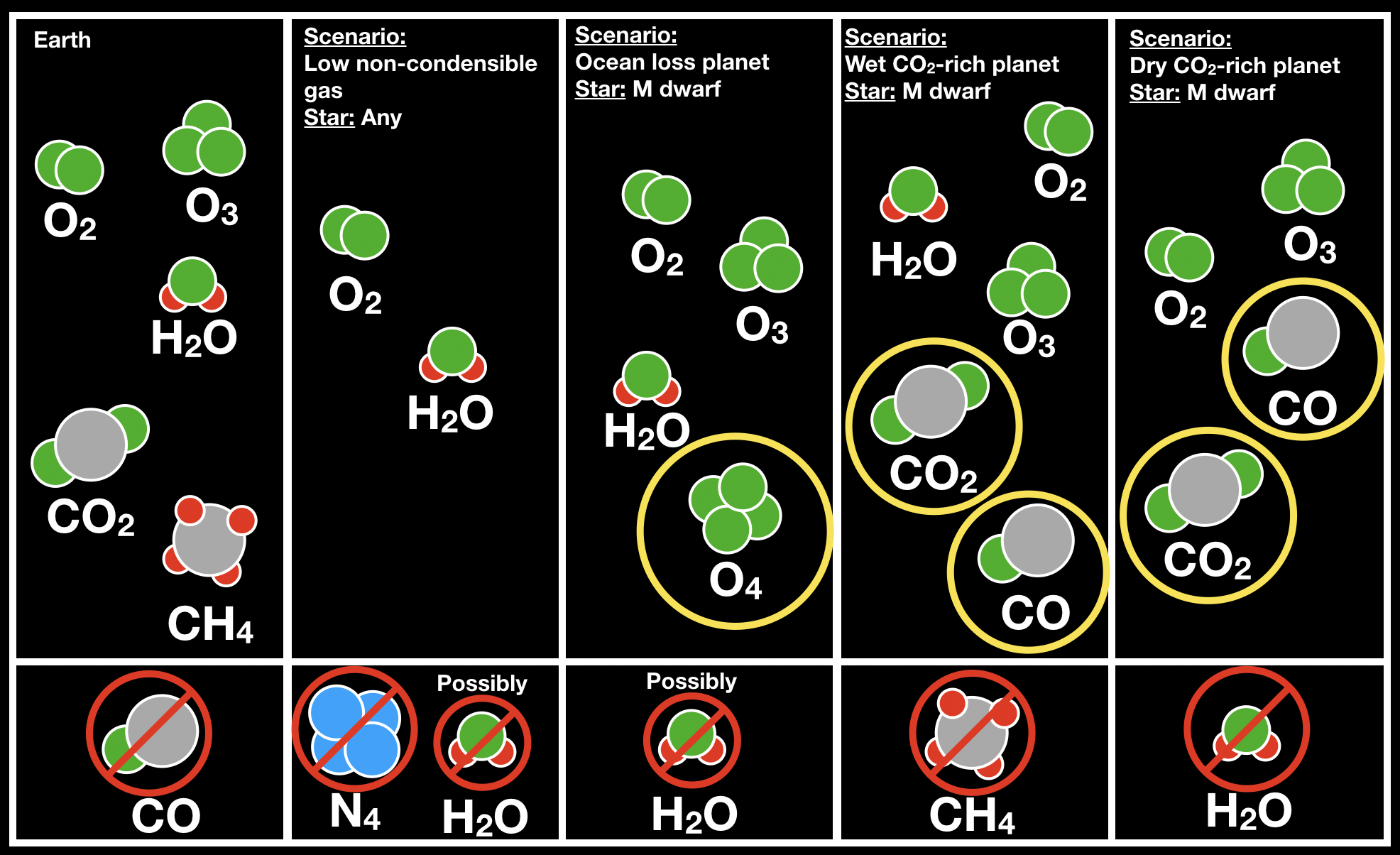
False positive mechanisms for oxygen on a variety of planet scenarios. The molecules in each large rectangle represent the main contributors to a spectrum of the planet's atmosphere. The molecules circled in yellow represent the molecules that would help confirm a false positive biosignature if they were detected. Furthermore, the molecules crossed out in red would help confirm a false positive biosignature if they were not detected. Cartoon adapted from Victoria Meadows' 2018 oxygen as a biosignature study.

=== Reliability ===
A biosignature must be able to dominate over all other processes that produce similar physical, spectral, and chemical features. Many forms of life are known to mimic geochemical reactions. One of the theories on the origin of life involves molecules developing the ability to catalyse geochemical reactions to exploit the energy being released by them. These are some of the earliest known metabolisms (see methanogenesis). In such case, scientists might search for a disequilibrium in the geochemical cycle, which would point to a reaction happening more or less often than it should. A disequilibrium such as this could be interpreted as an indication of life. However when looking at disequilibria, it is important to consider the context of the environment, because not all atmospheric disequilibria has biotic causes. For example, prebiotic environments can have chemical disequilibria due to volcanic activity.

=== Survivability ===
A biosignature must last for long enough so that a probe, telescope, or human can detect it. A consequence of a biological organism's use of metabolic reactions for energy is the production of metabolic waste. In addition, the structure of an organism can be preserved as a fossil and we know that some fossils on Earth are as old as 3.5 billion years. These byproducts can make excellent biosignatures since they provide direct evidence for life. However, in order to be a viable biosignature, a byproduct must subsequently remain intact so that scientists may discover it.

=== Detectability ===
A biosignature must be detectable with current technology in order to be considered viable in scientific investigations. Although this may seem straightforward, there are many scenarios in which life may be present on a planet yet remain undetectable due to observational or technological limitations.

==== False positives ====
Every possible biosignature is associated with its own set of unique false-positive mechanisms, in which abiotic processes can mimic the detectable feature of biological activity. An important example is using oxygen as a biosignature. On Earth, most oxygen is produced by photosynthesis and is subsequently used by other life forms. Oxygen is also readily detectable in spectra, with multiple bands across a relatively wide wavelength range, therefore, it makes a very good biosignature. Finding oxygen alone in a planet's atmosphere is not enough to confirm a biosignature because of the false-positive mechanisms associated with it. One possibility is that oxygen can build up abiotically via photolysis if there is a low inventory of non-condensable gasses or if the planet loses a lot of water. Finding and distinguishing a biosignature from its abiotic mechanisms is one of the major challenges of confirming the viability of a biosignature.

==== False negatives ====
False-negative biosignatures occur when life is present, but environmental processes and/or measurement limitations may obscure or suppress features that would otherwise indicate biological activity. This is another challenge that is a significant focus of ongoing research, especially in preparation for future telescope observations designed to observe exoplanetary atmospheres.

==== Human limitations ====
Observational or technological limitations may also limit the detectability of a potential biosignature. Telescope resolution maybe insufficient to resolve spectral features needed to distinguish between biological signals and false positives. In addition, observatories and telescopes are designed by multidisciplinary teams, resulting in instrumentation that reflects compromises among a variety of scientific priorities. As a result, optimizing instruments for biosignature detection may requires trade-offs with capabilities aimed at other science goals.

== General examples ==
=== Geomicrobiology ===
Life timeline
← / Earth formed; ← / Earliest water; ← / LUCA; ← / Earliest fossils; ← / Great Oxygenation Event; ← / Sexual reproduction; ← / Earliest fungi; ← / Neoproterozoic oxygenation event; ← / Ediacaran biota; ← / Cambrian explosion; ← / Earliest tetrapods; ← / Earliest hominoid
(million years ago)

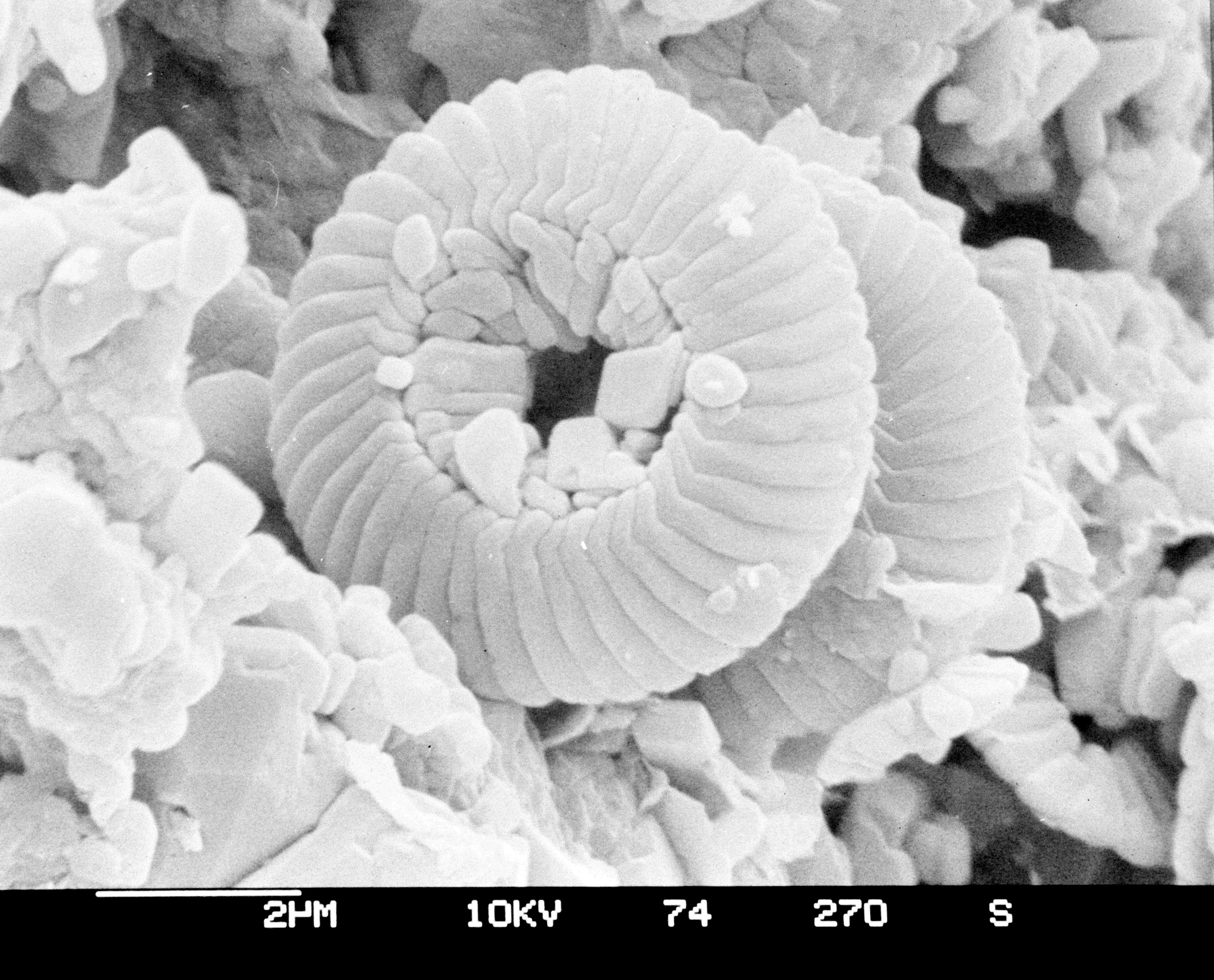
Electron micrograph of microfossils from a sediment core obtained by the Deep Sea Drilling Project

The ancient record on Earth provides an opportunity to see what geochemical signatures are produced by microbial life and how these signatures are preserved over geologic time. Some related disciplines such as geochemistry, geobiology, and geomicrobiology often use biosignatures to determine if living organisms are or were present in a sample. These possible biosignatures include: (a) microfossils and stromatolites; (b) molecular structures (biomarkers) and isotopic compositions of carbon, nitrogen and hydrogen in organic matter; (c) multiple sulfur and oxygen isotope ratios of minerals; and (d) abundance relationships and isotopic compositions of redox-sensitive metals (e.g., Fe, Mo, Cr, and rare earth elements).

For example, the particular fatty acids measured in a sample can indicate which types of bacteria and archaea live in that environment. Another example is the long-chain fatty alcohols with more than 23 atoms that are produced by planktonic bacteria. When used in this sense, geochemists often prefer the term biomarker. Another example is the presence of straight-chain lipids in the form of alkanes, alcohols, and fatty acids with 20–36 carbon atoms in soils or sediments. Peat deposits are an indication of originating from the epicuticular wax of higher plants.

Life processes may produce a range of biosignatures such as nucleic acids, lipids, proteins, amino acids, kerogen-like material, and various morphological features that are detectable in rocks and sediments. Microbes often interact with geochemical processes, leaving features in the rock record indicative of biosignatures. For example, bacterial micrometer-sized pores in carbonate rocks resemble inclusions under transmitted light, but have distinct sizes, shapes, and patterns (swirling or dendritic) and are distributed differently from common fluid inclusions. A potential biosignature is a phenomenon that may have been produced by life, but for which alternate abiotic origins may also be possible.

=== Morphology ===
Another possible biosignature might be morphology because the shape and size of certain objects may potentially indicate the presence of past or present life. Morphology has sparked debate as it is inconclusive and has resulted in disputed claims of early life on Earth.

Stromatolites are difficult to identify chemically and are sometimes claimed based on morphology alone. However geological processes may produce false positive candidates. One case is a 3.7 Ga structure in West Greenland which could be explained by tectonic processes.

=== Chemistry ===
No single compound will prove life once existed. Rather, it will be distinctive patterns present in any organic compounds showing a process of selection. For example, membrane lipids left behind by degraded cells will be concentrated, have a limited size range, and comprise an even number of carbons. Similarly, life only uses left-handed amino acids. Biosignatures need not be chemical, however, and can also be suggested by a distinctive magnetic biosignature.

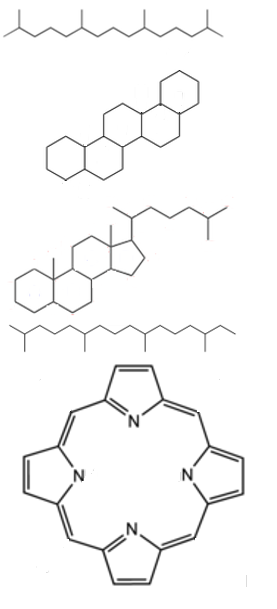
Structures of prime examples of biomarkers (petroleum), from top to bottom: Pristane, Triterpane, Sterane, Phytane, and Porphyrin

Chemical biosignatures include any suite of complex organic compounds composed of carbon, hydrogen, and other elements or heteroatoms such as oxygen, nitrogen, and sulfur, which are found in crude oils, bitumen, and petroleum source rock and eventually show simplification in molecular structure from the parent organic molecules found in all living organisms. They are complex carbon-based molecules derived from formerly living organisms. Each biomarker is quite distinctive when compared to its counterparts, as the time required for organic matter to convert to crude oil is characteristic. Most biomarkers also usually have high molecular mass.

Some examples of biomarkers found in petroleum are pristane, triterpanes, steranes, phytane, and porphyrin. Such petroleum biomarkers are produced via chemical synthesis using biochemical compounds as their main constituents. For instance, triterpenes are derived from biochemical compounds found on land angiosperm plants. The abundance of petroleum biomarkers in small amounts in its reservoir or source rock make it necessary to use sensitive and differential approaches to analyze the presence of those compounds. The techniques typically used include gas chromatography and mass spectrometry.

Petroleum biomarkers are highly important in petroleum inspection as they help indicate the depositional territories and determine the geological properties of oils. For instance, they provide more details concerning their maturity and the source material. In addition to that they can also be good parameters of age, hence they are technically referred to as "chemical fossils". The ratio of pristane to phytane (pr:ph) is the geochemical factor that allows petroleum biomarkers to be successful indicators of their depositional environments.

Geologists and geochemists use biomarker traces found in crude oils and their related source rock to unravel the stratigraphic origin and migration patterns of presently existing petroleum deposits. The dispersion of biomarker molecules is also quite distinctive for each type of oil and its source; hence, they display unique fingerprints. Another factor that makes petroleum biomarkers more preferable than their counterparts is that they have a high tolerance to environmental weathering and corrosion. Such biomarkers are very advantageous and often used in the detection of oil spillage in the major waterways. The same biomarkers can also be used to identify contamination in lubricant oils. However, biomarker analysis of untreated rock cuttings can be expected to produce misleading results. This is due to potential hydrocarbon contamination and biodegradation in the rock samples.

=== Atmospheric ===
The atmospheric properties of exoplanets are of particular importance, as atmospheres provide the most likely observables for the near future, including habitability indicators and biosignatures. Over billions of years, the processes of life on a planet would result in a mixture of chemicals unlike anything that could form in an ordinary chemical equilibrium. For example, large amounts of oxygen and small amounts of methane are generated by life on Earth.

An exoplanet's color—or reflectance spectrum—can also be used as a biosignature due to the effect of pigments that are uniquely biologic in origin such as the pigments of phototrophic and photosynthetic life forms. Scientists use the Earth as an example of this when looked at from far away (see Pale Blue Dot) as a comparison to worlds observed outside of the Solar System. Ultraviolet radiation on life forms could also induce biofluorescence in visible wavelengths that may be detected by the new generation of space observatories under development.

Some scientists have reported methods of detecting hydrogen and methane in extraterrestrial atmospheres. Habitability indicators and biosignatures must be interpreted within a planetary and environmental context. For example, the presence of oxygen and methane together could indicate the kind of extreme thermochemical disequilibrium generated by life. Two of the top 14,000 proposed atmospheric biosignatures are dimethyl sulfide and chloromethane (CH_{3}Cl). An alternative biosignature is the combination of methane and carbon dioxide.

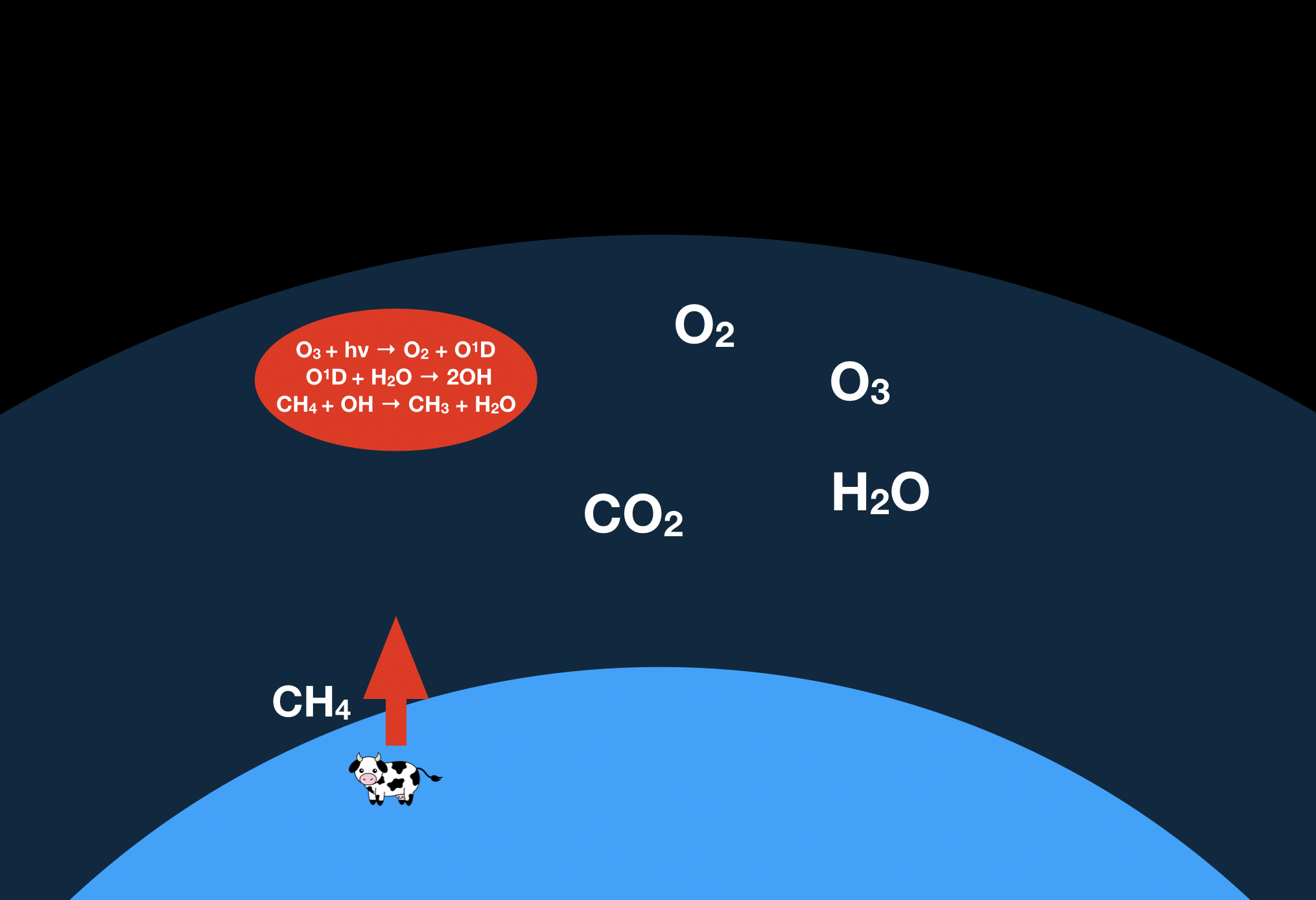
Biogenic methane production is the main contributor to the methane flux coming from the surface of Earth. Methane has a photochemical sink in the atmosphere but will build up if the flux is high enough. If there is detectable methane in the atmosphere of another planet, especially with a host star of G or K type, this may be interpreted as a viable biosignature.

A disequilibrium in the abundance of gas species in an atmosphere can be interpreted as a biosignature. Life has greatly altered the atmosphere on Earth in a way that would be unlikely for any other processes to replicate. Therefore, a departure from equilibrium is evidence for a biosignature. For example, the abundance of methane in the Earth's atmosphere is orders of magnitude above the equilibrium value due to the constant methane flux that life on the surface emits. Depending on the host star, a disequilibrium in the methane abundance on another planet may indicate a biosignature.

=== Agnostic biosignatures ===
Because the only known example of life is Earth life, the search for biosignatures is heavily influenced by the products and processes associated with life on Earth. However, life that is fundamentally different from life on Earth may still produce detectable biosignatures, even if its specific biology is unknown. Such indicators are referred to as "agnostic biosignatures," as they do not rely on assumptions about the biochemical nature of the life that generates them. It is widely accepted that all life–no matter how different it is from life on Earth–needs a source of energy to thrive. This must involve a chemical disequilibrium that can support metabolic processes. Geological processes operate independently of biology, and if the geologic state of a planet is well constrained, the expected geochemical equilibrium can be predicted. Departures from this equilibrium may indicate atmospheric disequilibrium and serve as potential agnostic biosignatures.

=== Antibiosignatures ===
Just as the detection of a biosignature would provide evidence for life, the identification of conditions that strongly indicate the absence of life can be scientifically significant. Such indicators are termed antibiosignatures. All known life relies on redox gradients to obtain energy, so a lifeless environment may accumulate large redox imbalances or significant amounts of unused chemical free energy. When such imbalances persist without evidence of biological processing, they can indicate that no organisms are present to exploit the available energy. In this context, a strong, unutilized chemical disequilibrium can function as an antibiosignature, by implying that biological activity is unlikely.

=== Polyelectrolytes ===
The polyelectrolyte theory of the gene is a proposed generic biosignature. In 2002, Steven A. Benner and Daniel Hutter proposed that for a linear genetic biopolymer dissolved in water, such as DNA, to undergo Darwinian evolution anywhere in the universe, it must be a polyelectrolyte, a polymer containing repeating ionic charges. Benner and others proposed methods for concentrating and analyzing these polyelectrolyte genetic biopolymers on Mars, Enceladus, and Europa.

== Search for life ==
Astrobiological exploration is founded upon the premise that biosignatures encountered in space will be recognizable as extraterrestrial life. The usefulness of a biosignature is determined not only by the probability of life creating it but also by the improbability of non-biological (abiotic) processes producing it. Concluding that evidence of an extraterrestrial life form (past or present) has been discovered requires proving that a possible biosignature was produced by the activities or remains of life. As with most scientific discoveries, discovery of a biosignature will require evidence building up until no other explanation exists.

A Life Detection Ladder summarizing measurable traits associated with living systems, ordered by how strongly they may indicate extant life. The framework, inspired by lessons from Viking and later missions, links biological features with the types of measurements that could support a confident life-detection claim.

Possible examples of a biosignature include complex organic molecules or structures whose formation is virtually unachievable in the absence of life:

1. Cellular and extracellular morphologies
2. Biomolecules in rocks
3. Bio-organic molecular structures
4. Homochirality: uniformity of chirality, or handedness, of biomolecules
5. Biogenic minerals
6. Biogenic isotope patterns in minerals and organic compounds
7. Atmospheric gases
8. Photosynthetic pigments

NASA and other space agencies use versions of a Life Detection Ladder as a planning tool for astrobiology missions. The ladder outlines a hierarchy of biological traits—chemical, structural, and ecological—that robotic instruments might detect, and evaluates how specific each trait is to living processes. By organizing potential biosignatures from least to most diagnostic, the ladder helps researchers design mission strategies, assess measurement credibility, and determine which combinations of evidence would be needed to support a claim of extant life beyond Earth.

== Search for life in the Solar System ==
=== Mars ===
==== Atmosphere of Mars ====
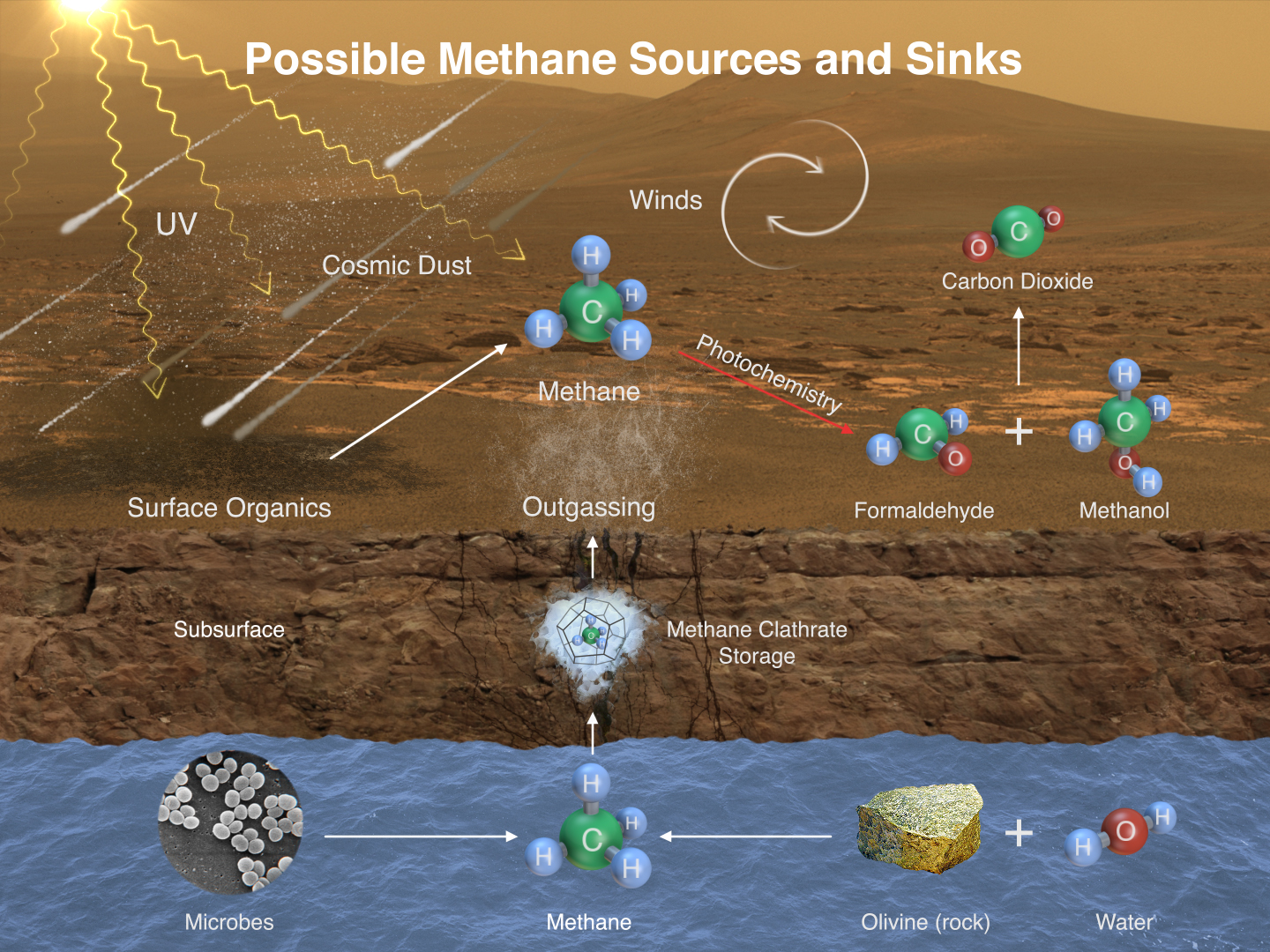
Methane (CH_{4}) on Mars - potential sources and sinks.

The atmosphere of Mars contains some gases which have been studied as potential biosignatures, most notably putative methane, but also ozone and oxygen.

===== Ozone in the Martian atmosphere =====
Mars has traces of ozone (including a seasonal ozone layer over the south pole in winter) and oxygen in its atmosphere both byproducts of life on Earth but explained by photochemistry on Mars. Mariner 7 detected ozone in 1971 and in 1976 by the Viking biological experiments. Significant levels of oxygen were detected in Gale Crater by Curiosity Rover in 2019 with seasonal variability that has not fully been explained. Studies indicate that the Martian atmosphere was once oxygen-rich. Today they are no longer considered valid biosignatures and are proposed to be the result of photodissociation of carbon dioxide.

===== Methane in the Martian atmosphere =====
Martian methane is an area of ongoing research. With life being the strongest source of methane on Earth, continued observation of such a disequilibrium could be a viable biosignature. Current photochemical models cannot explain the reported rapid variations in space and time. Neither its fast appearance nor disappearance have been explained. Because of its tendency to be destroyed in the atmosphere by photochemistry, excess methane could indicate that there must be an active source.

Since 2004 there have been several detection claims of methane in the Mars atmosphere by a variety of instruments onboard orbiters and ground-based landers on the Martian surface as well as Earth-based telescopes. However 2019 measurements put an upper bound on the overall methane abundance at 0.05 p.p.b.v contradicting previous observations.

The Curiosity rover's Tunable Laser Spectrometer (TLS) has detected methane on the Martian surface. However, this data is inconclusive due to methane leaks in the TLS that have most likely contaminated the methane readings from the surface of Mars.

To rule out a biogenic origin for the methane, a future probe or lander hosting a mass spectrometer will be needed first to prove its presence, and second, to use the isotopic proportions of carbon-12 to carbon-14 in methane to distinguish between a biogenic and non-biogenic origin, similarly to the use of the δ13C standard for recognizing biogenic methane on Earth.

===== CO and H2 in Martian atmosphere =====
The Martian atmosphere contains high abundances of photochemically produced CO and H_{2}, which are reducing molecules. Mars' atmosphere is otherwise mostly oxidizing, leading to a source of untapped energy that life could exploit if it used by a metabolism compatible with one or both of these reducing molecules. Because these molecules can be observed, scientists use this as evidence for an antibiosignature. Scientists have used this concept as an argument against life on Mars.

==== Possible bioorganic chemistry on Mars ====
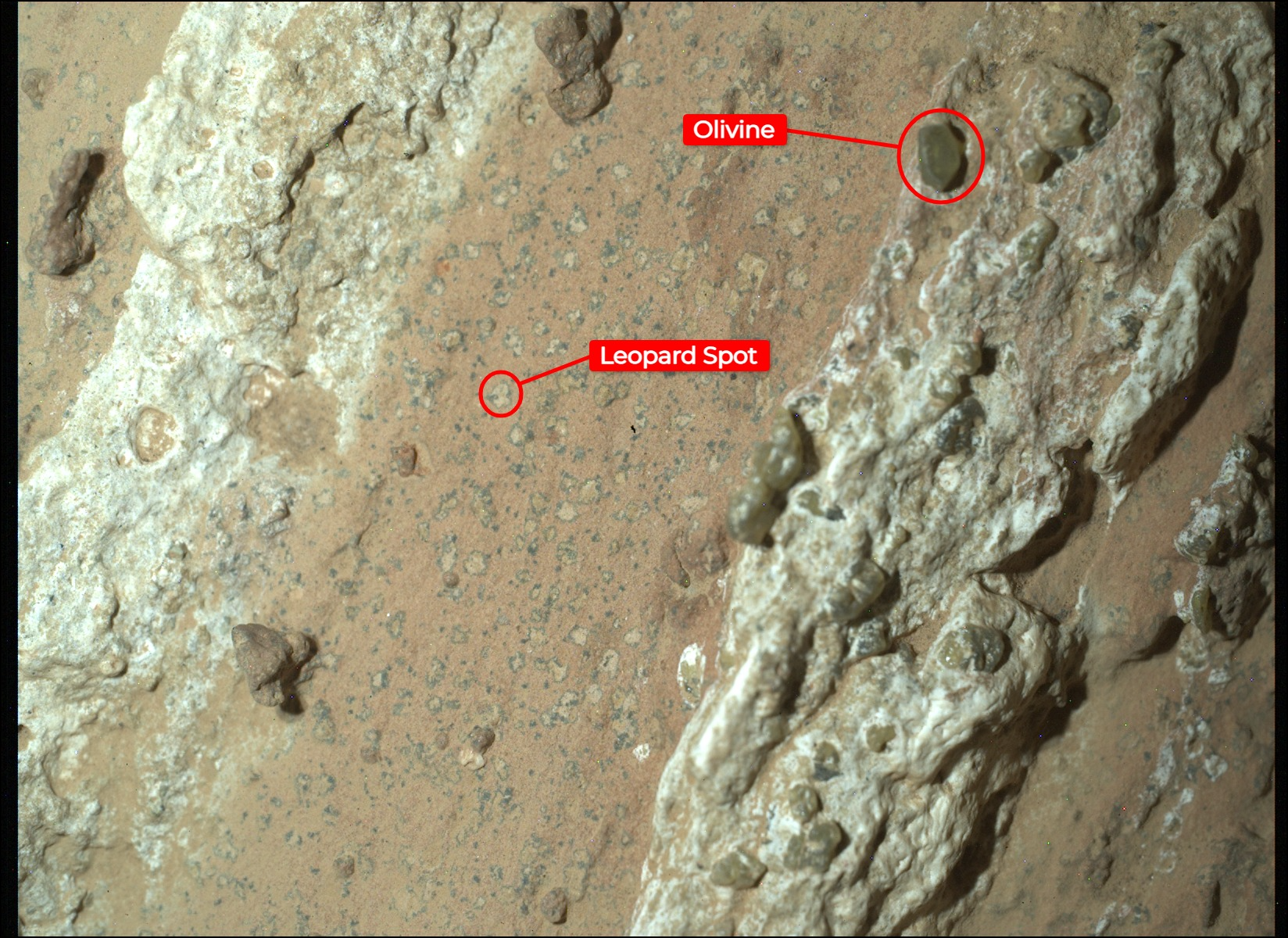
Cheyava Falls discovered at Jezero crater in 2024 displays elements often associated with microbial life.

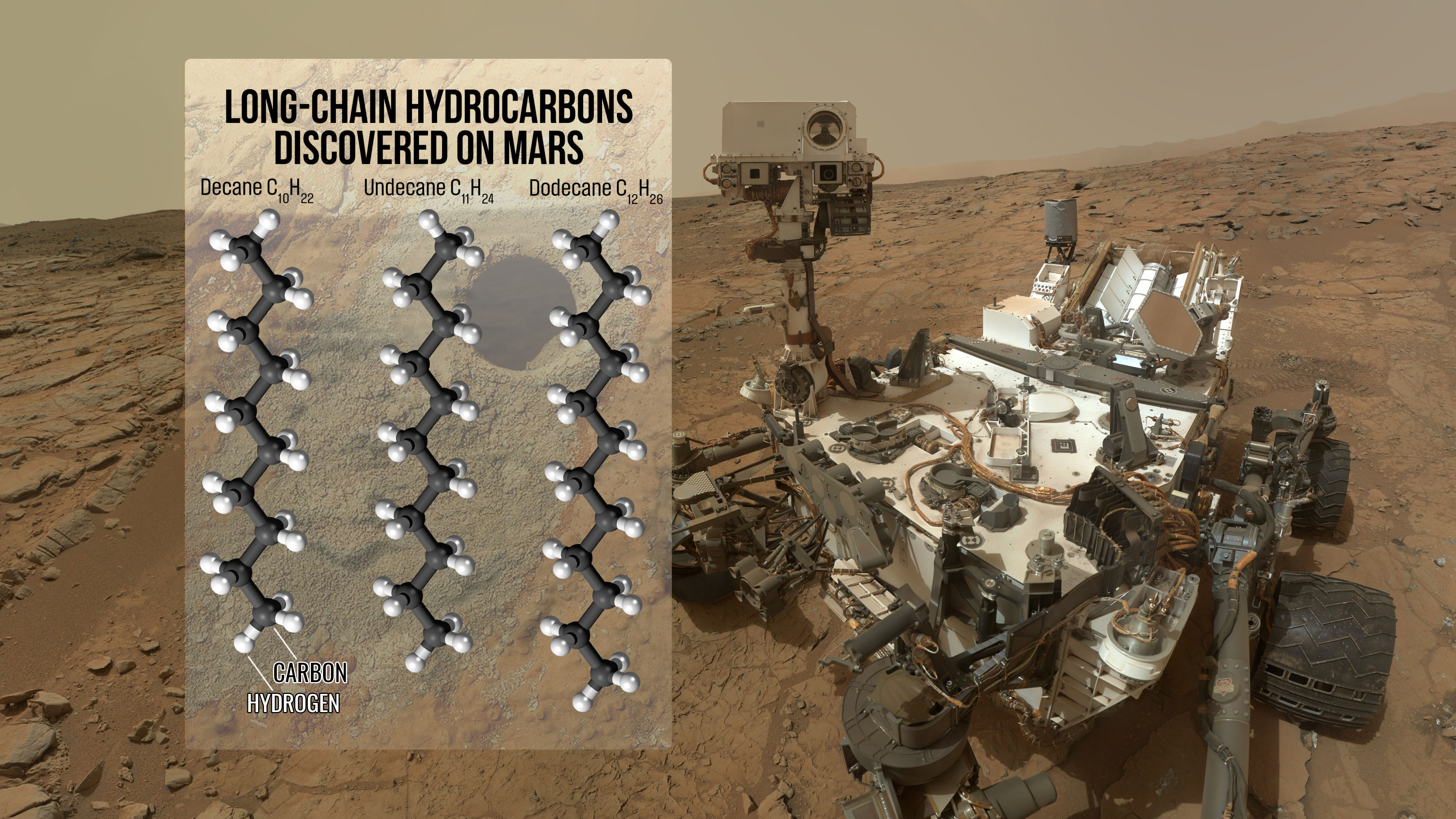
Discovery of long-chain hydrocarbons by SAM at Gale Crater in 2025. These fatty acids are the key components of cell membranes.

Organic chemistry has been discovered on Mars, some of which can be explained by geochemical processes. Chlorobenzene (C_{6}H_{5}Cl), for example, was detected as early as the Viking lander biological experiments and later in sedimentary rocks by Curiosity likely from perchlorate reactions with organic matter. Some abiotic source, such as a Fischer–Tropsch process, could also have produced alkanes.

Some discoveries have been found in areas confirmed previously be wet, adding weight to their significance. In 2018 at Gale Crater, Curiosity discovered thiophene (C_{4}H_{4}S) and polymers (polythiophene). Natural sulfur reduction has been proposed as a possible abiotic source. Dimethyl sulfide (CH_{2}S) was also detected. In Cheyava Falls discovered by Perseverance in July 2024, organic matter was detected. Also found were millimeter-sized splotches resembling "leopard spots" containing iron and phosphate, elements often associated with microbial life. In 2025, analysis of rocks from Gale Crater by SAM found decane (C_{10}H_{22}), dodecane (C_{12}H_{26}) and undecane (CH_{3}(CH_{2})_{9}CH_{3}), collectively known as fatty acids, which terrestrial cell membranes are made of. However these have formed on meteorites, which may have delivered them to Mars.

An analysis of 2020 data from Mary Anning3 (MA3) from SAM TMAH found evidence for more than 20 complex molecules including nitrogen heterocyclic compounds considered precursors to RNA and DNA along with many other volatile compounds. Molecules detected included trimethylbenzene, tetramethylbenzene, methyl benzoate, dihydronaphthalene, naphthalene, benzothiophene, and methylnaphthalene. While there is currently no abiotic explanation for the complex organics found, exogenous sources must first be ruled out.

==== Mars missions ====
===== The Viking missions to Mars =====
The Viking Landers (1976) performed the first in situ biological experiments on Mars, testing for metabolic activity using gas-exchange and labeled-release assays. Although some experiments produced responses initially interpreted as possible metabolic signatures, the absence of organic molecules in Viking’s gas chromatograph–mass spectrometer led to widespread disagreement over the biological interpretation. The results remain inconclusive, and the experiments are often cited as an example of the need for multiple, independent lines of evidence when evaluating biosignatures. The Viking findings also highlighted the importance of characterizing the inorganic chemistry of the environment, as biosignatures cannot be reliably interpreted without understanding the abiotic context in which they may occur.

===== Mars Science Laboratory =====
The Curiosity rover from the Mars Science Laboratory mission, with its Curiosity rover is currently assessing the potential past and present habitability of the Martian environment and is attempting to detect biosignatures on the surface of Mars. Considering the MSL instrument payload package, the following classes of biosignatures are within the MSL detection window: organism morphologies (cells, body fossils, casts), biofabrics (including microbial mats), diagnostic organic molecules, isotopic signatures, evidence of biomineralization and bioalteration, spatial patterns in chemistry, and biogenic gases. The Curiosity rover targets outcrops to maximize the probability of detecting 'fossilized' organic matter preserved in sedimentary deposits.

===== ExoMars orbiter =====
The 2016 ExoMars Trace Gas Orbiter (TGO) is a Mars telecommunications orbiter and atmospheric gas analyzer mission. It delivered the Schiaparelli EDM lander and then began to settle into its science orbit to map the sources of methane on Mars and other gases, and in doing so, will help select the landing site for the Rosalind Franklin rover to be launched in 2028. The primary objective of the Rosalind Franklin rover mission is the search for biosignatures on the surface and subsurface by using a drill able to collect samples down to a depth of 2 metres (6.6 ft), away from the destructive radiation that bathes the surface.

===== Mars 2020 =====
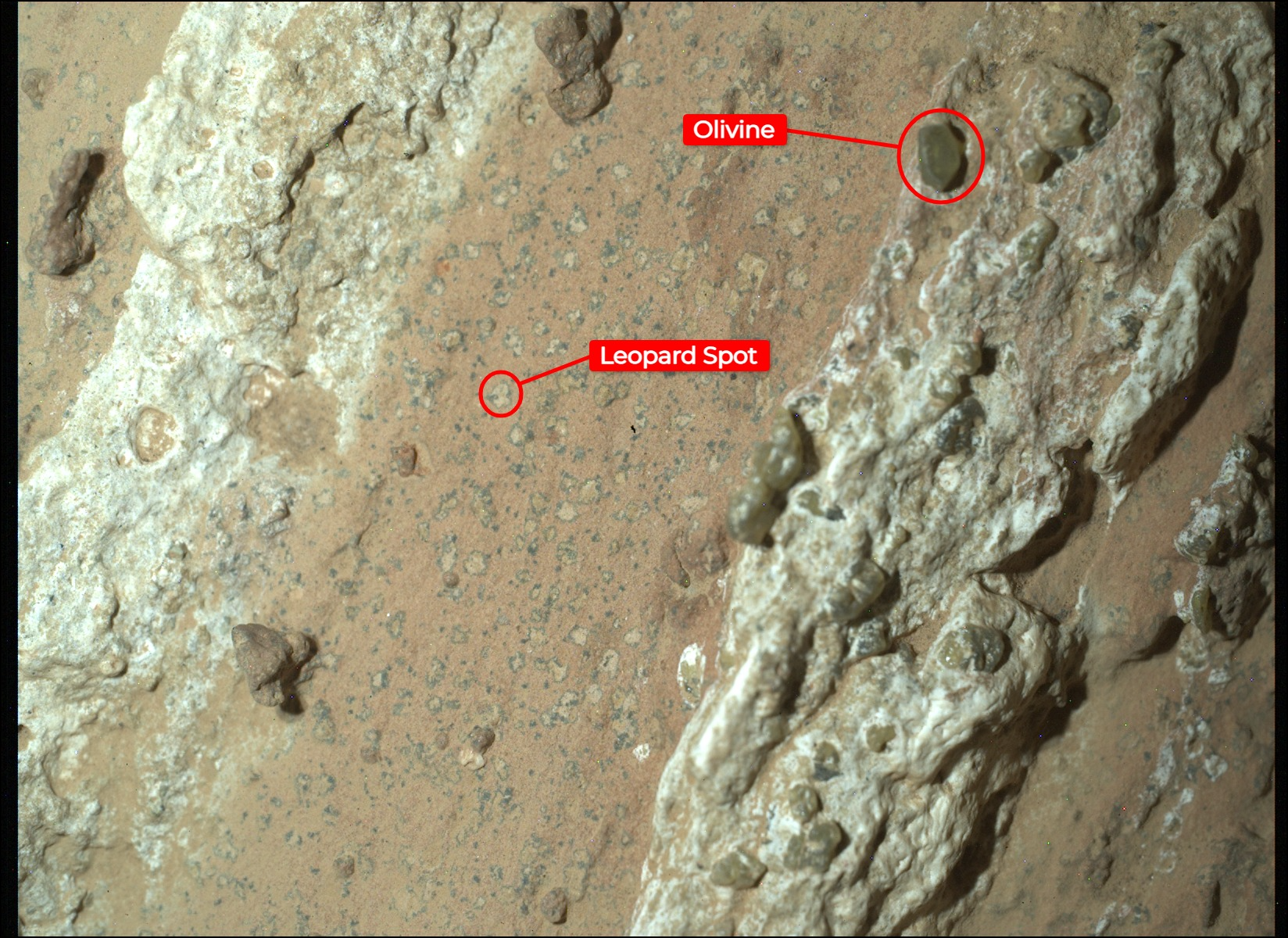
Cheyava Falls rock

The Mars 2020 rover, which launched in 2020, is intended to investigate an astrobiologically relevant ancient environment on Mars, investigate its surface geological processes and history, including the assessment of its past habitability, the possibility of past life on Mars, and potential for preservation of biosignatures within accessible geological materials. In addition, it will cache the most interesting samples for possible future transport to Earth.

In 2024, Perseverance found a rock, called Cheyava Falls, during its exploration of the Jezero Crater. The rover's instruments detected organic compounds within the rock. According to NASA, Cheyava Falls "possesses qualities that fit the definition of a possible indicator of ancient life".

On 10 September 2025, NASA reported a "potential biosignature" finding in Cheyava Falls: organic-carbon–bearing mudstones hosting sub-millimetre nodules and millimetre-scale reaction fronts enriched in ferrous iron phosphate and iron sulfide, consistent with vivianite and greigite imply low-temperature, post-depositional redox reactions between organics and Fe–S–P minerals; these textures and chemistries qualify as potential biosignatures but requiring further study and sample return for confirmation. On Earth, vivianite is frequently found in sediments, peat bogs, and around decaying organic matter. Similarly, certain forms of microbial life on Earth can produce greigite. The same organic materials can be produced by non-biological processes which require "hot conditions" like volcanic activity; the rock location suggests that it was underwater, and there is no detected past volcanic activity in that region.

If confirmed, this biosignature would mean that there were a microbial life on Mars around 3.5 billion years ago. According to geologist Michael Tice:

If the Cheyava Falls results ultimately do lead to the proof of ancient life on Mars ... that means two different planets hosted microbes getting their energy through the same means at about the same time in the distant past. That could suggest that early life learns how to survive in this way regardless of where it originated.

=== Venus ===
==== Atmosphere of Venus ====
The atmosphere of Venus continues to be investigated for potential biosignatures though abiotic processes have been put forward as explanations.

===== Ammonia in the Venusian atmosphere =====
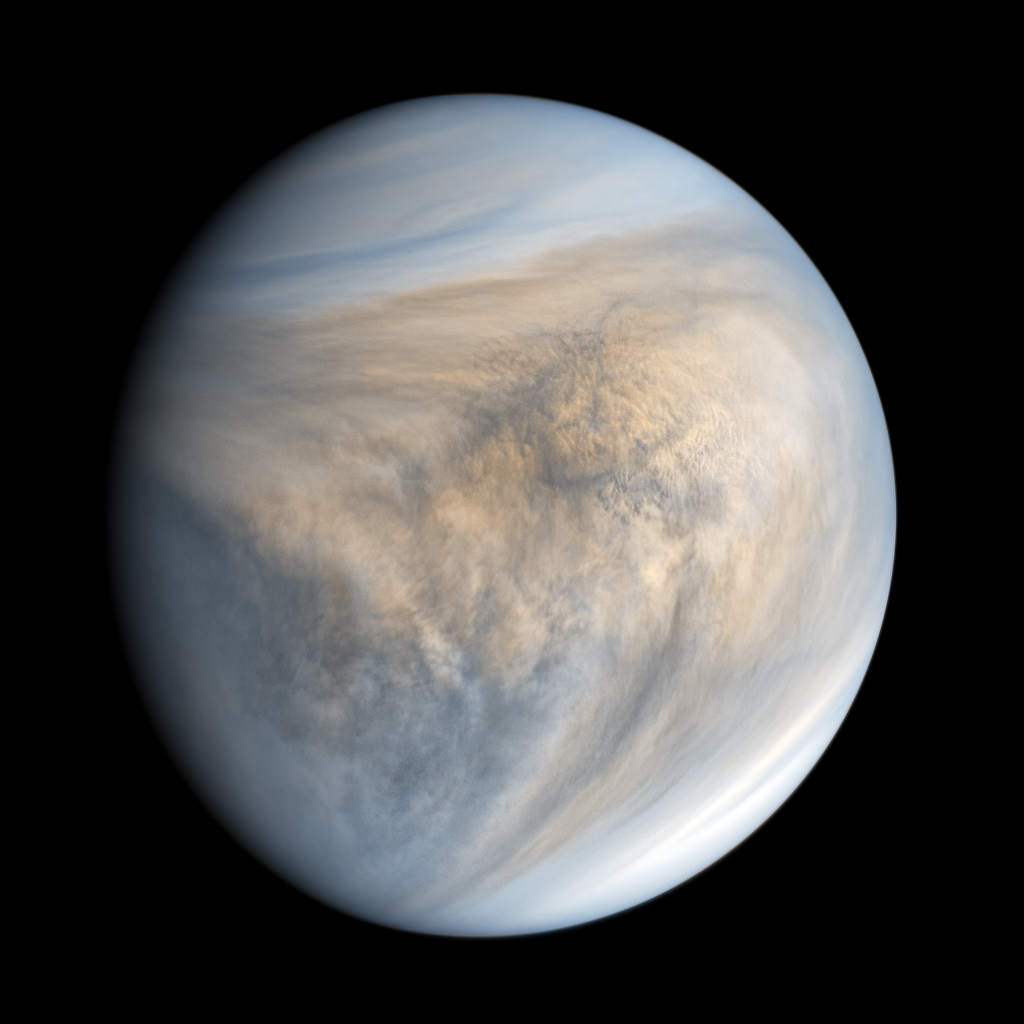
Cloud structure of the Venusian atmosphere (made visible through ultraviolet imaging) which contains phosphine, ammonia and ozone considered candidate biosignatures.

Ammonia (NH_{3}) was first detected in the atmosphere by the bromophenol blue chemical sensor of Venera 8 in 1972. Ammonia is essential to life and is both a metabolic input and output, as such it has been explored as having strong potential as a biosignature. Pioneer Venus also detected substantial quantities of the gas. Of particular interest is that unlike the Martian atmosphere where conditions would suit ammonia's presence only transient trace amounts have been detected, on Venus with conditions less conducive to its presence it appears to somehow be replenished. A 2021 paper claimed that it could be a byproduct of life that is in turn providing a stable habitable environment for life to continue in the upper atmosphere. At least one paper puts forward a possible abiotic explanation, proposing that similar processes as nitrogen fixation in early Earth's atmosphere though caused by mantle oxidation due to the planet's water loss. Another has proposed that lightning could be producing it though whether Venus has lightning at all has been extensively debated.

===== Ozone in the Venusian atmosphere =====
Ozone (O_{3}) was first detected at concentrations of up to 1 ppm in the night side upper atmosphere by Venus Express in 2011. As a byproduct of living organisms this was once regarded as a candidate biosignature. Known since the 1970s to exists in trace amounts in the Martian atmosphere, Venus in comparison possesses a significant layer similar to but substantially less concentrated than Earth's. Photochemical processes, specifically dissociation of carbon dioxide (CO2) by sunlight, is now offered an explanation for its presence.

===== Phosphine in the Venusian atmosphere =====
Phosphine (PH_{3}) was first detected in 2020 by the James Clerk Maxwell Telescope and the Atacama Large Millimeter/submillimeter Array in trace amounts in the upper cloud deck. There was no known abiotic source for the quantities detected. Subsequent analysis and investigation between 2020 and 2015 indicated possible false detection, or a much lower concentration of 1 ppb. However in September 2024, the preliminary analysis of the JCMT-Venus data confirmed a concentration of 300 ppb at altitude 55 km. Further data processing is still needed to measure phosphine concentration deeper in the Venusian cloud deck.

==== Morning Star missions to Venus ====
The Venus Life Finder is a planned mission to Venus, scheduled to launch no earlier than summer of 2026. The goal of these missions is to detecting potential organics, measure acidity, and determine the unknown UV absorber in the clouds of Venus.

=== Icy Moons ===
==== Missions ====
===== Europa Clipper =====
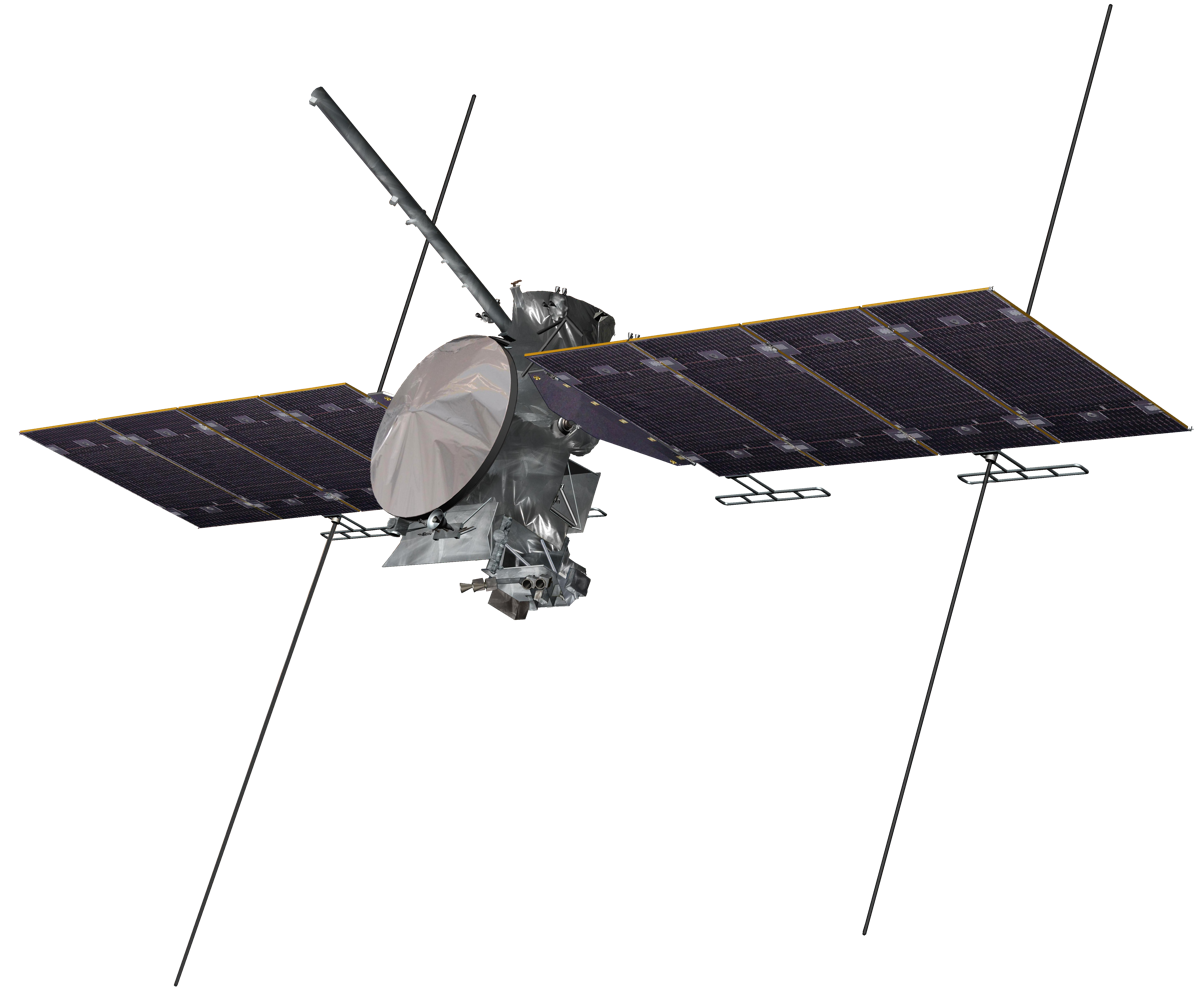
Europa Clipper

NASA's Europa Clipper probe is designed as a flyby mission to Jupiter's smallest Galilean moon, Europa. The mission launched in October 2024 and is set to reach Europa in April 2030, where it will investigate the potential for habitability on Europa. Europa is one of the best candidates for biosignature discovery in the Solar System because of the scientific consensus that it retains a subsurface ocean, with two to three times the volume of water on Earth. Evidence for this subsurface ocean includes:

- Voyager 1 (1979): The first close-up photos of Europa are taken. Scientists propose that a subsurface ocean could cause the tectonic-like marks on the surface.
- Galileo (1997): The magnetometer aboard this probe detected a subtle change in the magnetic field near Europa. This was later interpreted as a disruption in the expected magnetic field due to the current induction in a conducting layer on Europa. The composition of this conducting layer is consistent with a salty subsurface ocean.
- Hubble Space Telescope (2012): An image was taken of Europa which showed evidence for a plume of water vapor coming off the surface.

The Europa Clipper probe includes instruments to help confirm the existence and composition of a subsurface ocean and thick icy layer. In addition, the instruments will be used to map and study surface features that may indicate tectonic activity due to a subsurface ocean.

===== Dragonfly =====
NASA's Dragonfly lander/aircraft concept is proposed to launch in 2028 and would seek evidence of biosignatures on the organic-rich surface and atmosphere of Titan, as well as study its possible prebiotic primordial soup. Titan is the largest moon of Saturn and is widely believed to have a large subsurface ocean consisting of a salty brine. In addition, scientists believe that Titan may have the conditions necessary to promote prebiotic chemistry, making it a prime candidate for biosignature discovery.

==== Enceladus ====
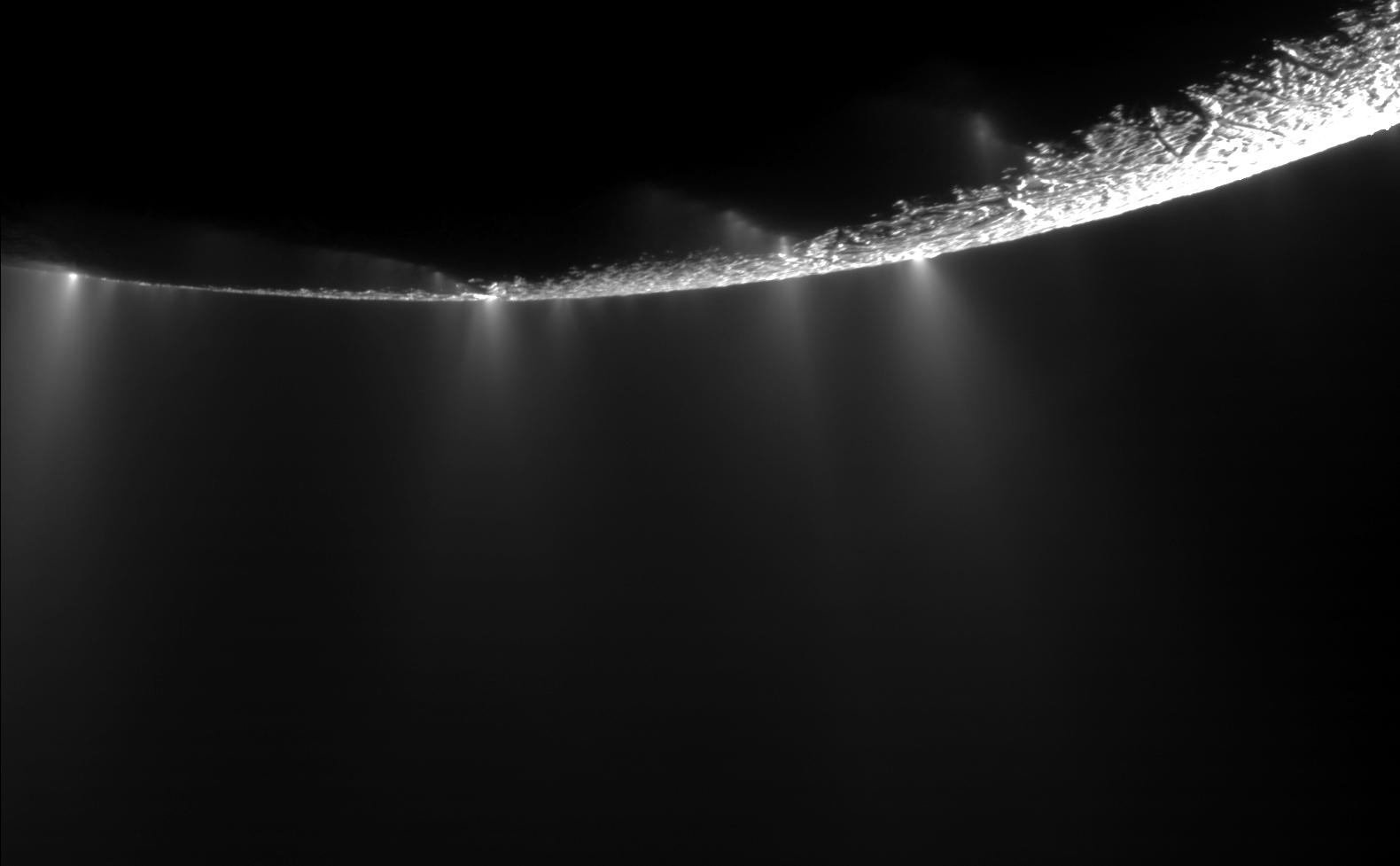
An image of the plumes of water and ice coming from the surface of Enceladus. Future missions will investigate these geysers to determine the composition and look for signs of life.

Although there are no set plans to search for biosignatures on Saturn's sixth-largest moon, Enceladus, the prospects of biosignature discovery there are exciting enough to warrant several mission concepts that may be funded in the future. Similar to Jupiter's moon Europa, there is much evidence for a subsurface ocean to also exist on Enceladus. Plumes of water vapor were first observed in 2005 by the Cassini mission and were later determined to contain salt as well as organic compounds. In 2014, more evidence was presented using gravimetric measurements on Enceladus to conclude that there is in fact a large reservoir of water underneath an icy surface. Mission design concepts include:

- Enceladus Life Finder (ELF)
- Enceladus Life Signatures and Habitability
- Enceladus Organic Analyzer
- Enceladus Explorer (En-Ex)
- Explorer of Enceladus and Titan (E^{2}T)
- Journey to Enceladus and Titan (JET)
- Life Investigation For Enceladus (LIFE)
- Testing the Habitability of Enceladus's Ocean (THEO)

All of these concept missions have similar science goals: To assess the habitability of Enceladus and search for biosignatures, in line with the strategic map for exploring the ocean-world Enceladus.

=== Meteorites ===
==== Martian meteorites ====
===== ALH84001 =====
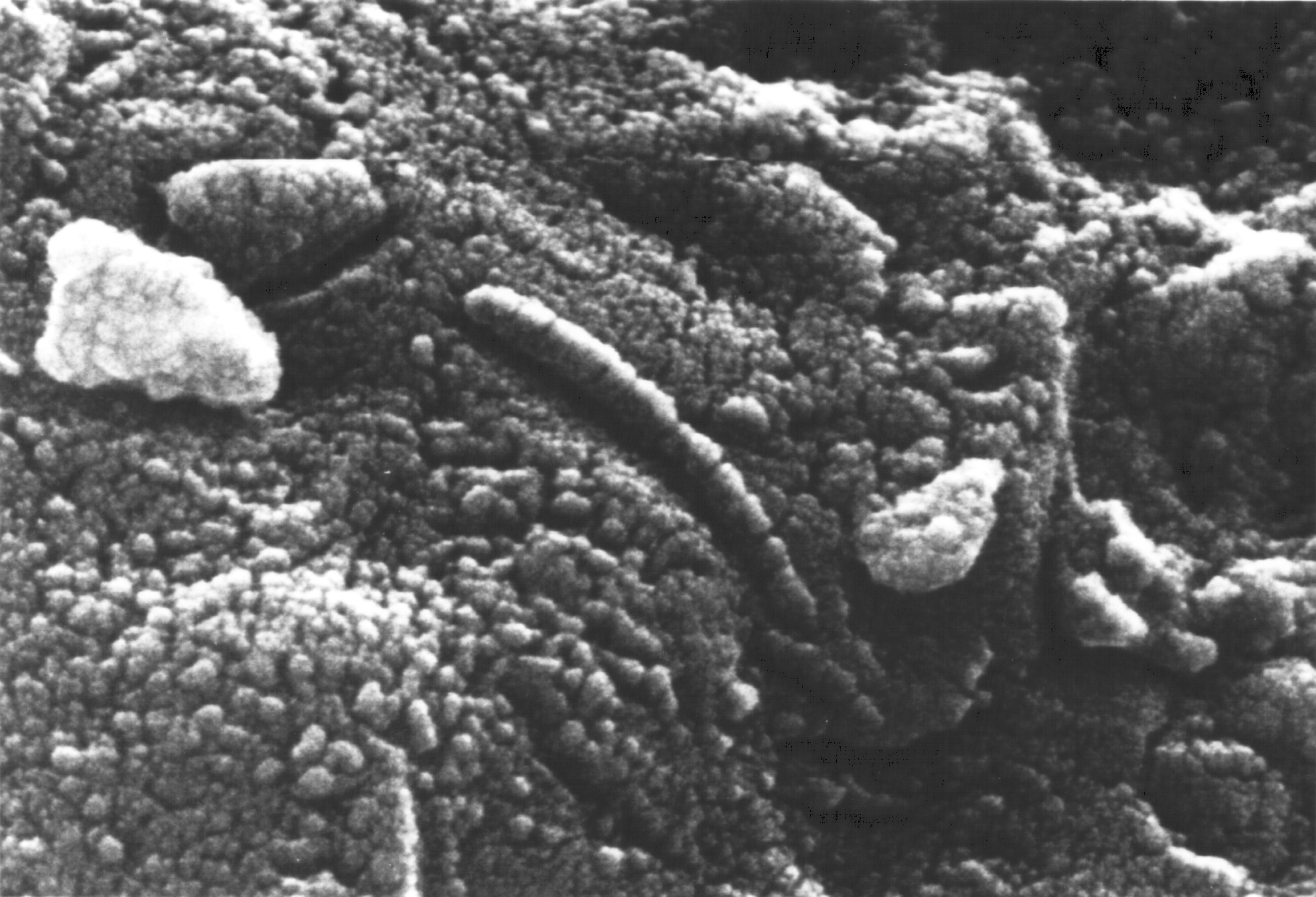
Some researchers suggested that these microscopic structures on the Martian ALH84001 meteorite could be fossilized bacteria.

Microscopic magnetite crystals in the Martian meteorite ALH84001 represent one of the longest-standing and most debated potential biosignatures identified in that specimen. Analyses focused on proposed biominerals, including putative microbial microfossils. These are minute rock-like structures whose morphology was initially suggestive of bacterial shapes. Subsequent studies indicated that these features were likely too small to represent fossilized cells. A broader consensus emerged from these discussions emphasizing that morphological evidence alone is insufficient to substantiate claims of life and must be supported by multiple, independent lines of evidence. Interpretation based solely on morphology are highly subjective and have historically led to numerous misidentifications.

== Search for life outside the Solar System ==
At 4.2 light-years (1.3 parsecs, 40 trillion km, or 25 trillion miles) away from Earth, the closest potentially habitable exoplanet is Proxima Centauri b, which was discovered in 2016. This means it would take more than 18,100 years to get there if a vessel could consistently travel as fast as the Juno spacecraft (250,000 kilometers per hour or 150,000 miles per hour). It is currently not feasible to send humans or even probes to search for biosignatures outside of the Solar System. The only way to search for biosignatures outside of the Solar System is by observing exoplanets with telescopes.

=== Exoplanets ===
==== K2-18b ====
On September 12, 2023, scientists announced that their investigation into exoplanet K2-18b revealed the possible presence of dimethyl sulfide, noting that it is produced only by biotic processes on Earth. In 2025, another paper was published confirming dimethyl sulfide and dimethyl disulfide on the exoplanet. However, a follow-up study questions the James Webb Space Telescope's instrumentation's ability to differentiate the signature of dimethyl sulfide from methane in the data, which is noisy. Additionally, follow-up studies have identified potential abiotic sources.

=== Telescopes ===
There have been no plausible or confirmed biosignature detections outside of the Solar System. Despite this, the research field is growing quickly due to the prospects of next generation of telescopes. The James Webb Space Telescope, launched in December 2021, is anticipated to increase capablities in the search for biosignatures. Although its wavelength range and resolution is not compatible with some prevalent atmospheric biosignature gas bands, like oxygen, it will still be able to detect some evidence for oxygen false positive mechanisms.

The Habitable Worlds Observatory is a NASA telescope currently in design, expected to launch in the 2040s. It will specifically target potentially habitable exoplanets, to characterize and observe any potential biosignatures for Earth-like exoplanets.

The new generation of ground-based 30-meter class telescopes (Thirty Meter Telescope and Extremely Large Telescope) will have the ability to take high-resolution spectra of exoplanet atmospheres at a variety of wavelengths. These telescopes will be capable of distinguishing some of the more difficult false positive mechanisms such as the abiotic buildup of oxygen via photolysis. In addition, their large collecting area will enable high angular resolution, making direct imaging studies more feasible.

== Bibliography ==
- Gaines, Susan M.; Eglinton, Geoffrey; Rullkotter, Jurgen (2008). Echoes of Life: What Fossil Molecules Reveal about Earth History. Oxford University Press. ISBN 978-0-19-517619-3.

== See also ==
- Bioindicator
- Taphonomy
- Technosignature
