= Coldwater River =

Coldwater River may refer to:

== In Canada ==
- Coldwater River (British Columbia)
- Coldwater River (Algoma District), which flows to Lake Superior
- Coldwater River (Simcoe County), which flows to Lake Huron

== In the United States ==
- Coldwater River (Branch County), Michigan
- Coldwater River (Isabella County), Michigan
- Coldwater River (Western Michigan)
- Coldwater River (Mississippi)
- Cold Water River, alternate name for Blackwater River, Florida

== See also ==
- Coldwater River National Wildlife Refuge, Mississippi
- Coldwater Creek (disambiguation)
- Cold River (disambiguation)
