= Coldwater High School =

Coldwater High School may refer to:

- Coldwater High School (Michigan) — Coldwater, Michigan
- Coldwater High School (Mississippi) — Coldwater, Mississippi
- Coldwater High School (Ohio) — Coldwater, Ohio
