= Colder =

Colder may refer to:

- The comparative of cold
- Colder (musician), French electronic producer
- "Colder", a song by Charon from the album Songs for the Sinners
- "Colder", a song by Nina Nesbitt from the album The Sun Will Come Up, the Seasons Will Change
- Mary Frances Colder (1818–1854), African American journalist and abolitionist
