= Coldest place =

Coldest place may refer to:

- The coldest place on earth, the Pole of Cold in Antarctica.
- The coldest temperatures seen in the known universe. See Absolute zero § Very low temperatures.

== See also ==
- List of weather records
- The Coldest City
