= Coldwater Creek =

Coldwater Creek or Cold Water Creek may refer to:

- Coldwater Creek (clothing retailer)
- Coldwater Creek (Missouri river tributary), a stream in St. Louis County, Missouri
- Coldwater Creek (South Grand River tributary), a stream in Missouri and Kansas
- Coldwater Creek (Saline Creek tributary), a stream in Ste. Genevieve County, Missouri
- Cold Water Creek (Irish Buffalo Creek tributary), a stream in Cabarrus and Rowan Counties, North Carolina
- Coldwater Creek (Oklahoma), a tributary of the Beaver River
