= Enceladus Orbilander =

Proposed NASA space probe to Saturn's moon Enceladus

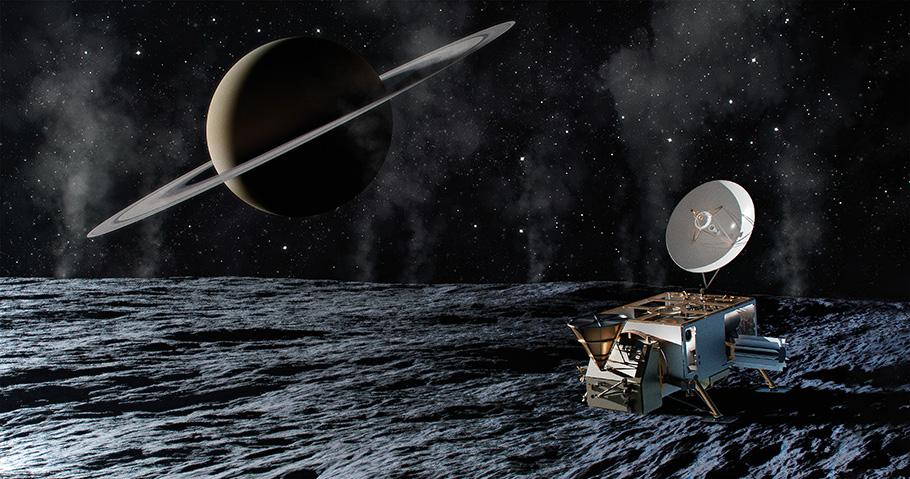
- Artist's impression of the Enceladus Orbilander
- Mission type: Enceladus Orbiter and Lander
- Operator: NASA
- Website: https://space.jhuapl.edu/projects-and-studies/enceladus-orbilander
- Mission duration: Overall: ~15 years total; 3.5 years at Enceladus; En route: 7 year cruise; 4 years Saturnian moons tour; Science Phase: 1.5 years Enceladus orbit; 2 years on Enceladus surface

Spacecraft properties
- Manufacturer: APL (proposed)
- Launch mass: 6610 kg
- Dry mass: 2690 kg
- Power: 741 W (at launch) 589 W (landing)

Start of mission
- Launch date: October 2038 (proposed)
- Rocket: Space Launch System Block 2 (proposed)
- Launch site: Kennedy Space Center, Pad 39B
- Contractor: NASA

Flyby of Jupiter
- Closest approach: October 2040 (proposed)
- Distance: 4,730,000 km (2,940,000 mi)

Saturn orbiter
- Orbital insertion: August 2045 (proposed)
- Orbital departure: early 2050 (proposed)

Enceladus orbiter
- Orbital insertion: early 2050 (proposed)
- Orbital departure: mid 2051 (proposed)

Enceladus lander
- Landing date: mid 2051 (proposed)
- Large Strategic Science Missions; Planetary Science Division Solar System Exploration program

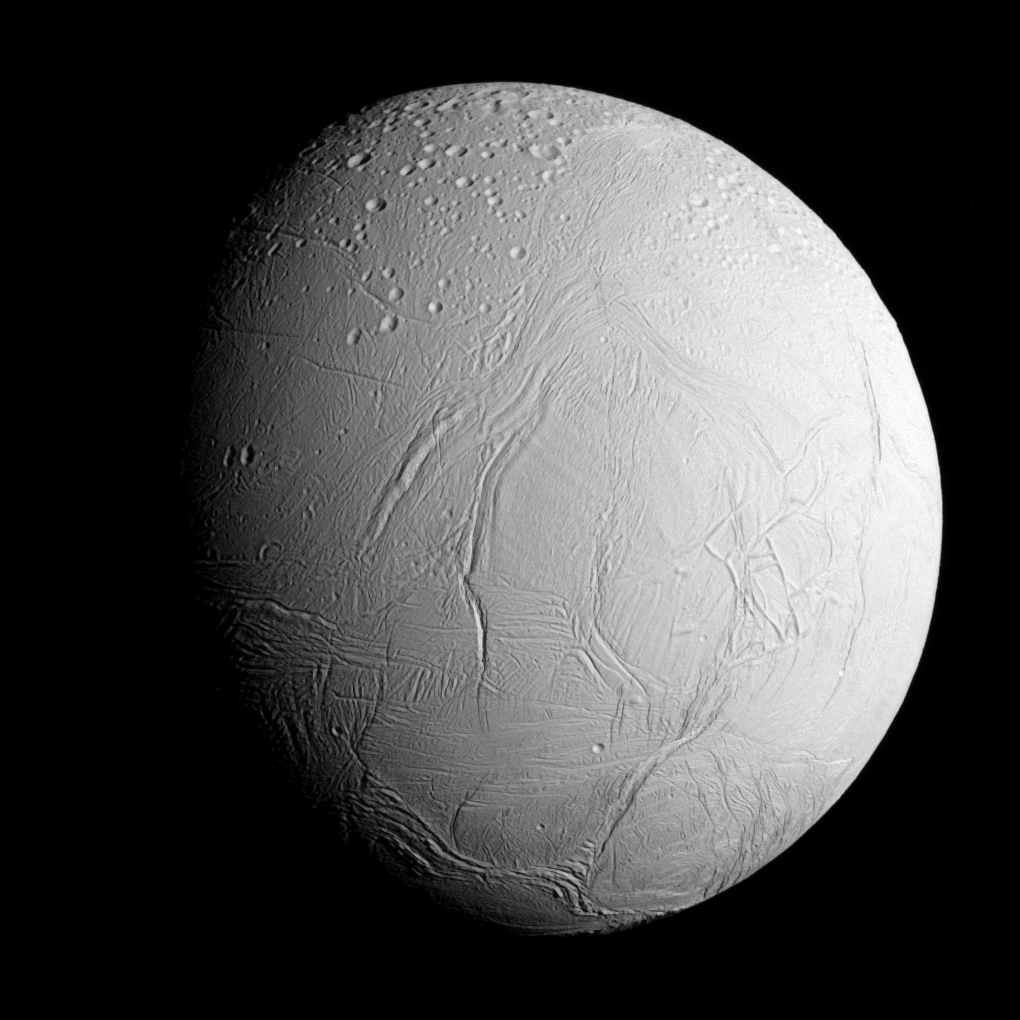
Enceladus's south pole, captured by NASA's Cassini-Huygens spacecraft, 2015

The Enceladus Orbilander is a proposed NASA Flagship mission to Saturn's moon Enceladus. The Enceladus Orbilander would spend a year and a half orbiting Enceladus and sampling its water plumes, which stretch into space, before landing on the surface for a two-year mission to study materials for evidence of life. The mission, with an estimated cost of $4.9 billion, could launch in the late 2030s on a Space Launch System or Falcon Heavy with a landing in the early 2050s. It was proposed in the 2023–2032 Planetary Science Decadal Survey as the second highest priority Flagship mission, after the Uranus Orbiter and Probe.

== Background ==
At 500 kilometres (310 miles) in diameter, Enceladus is the sixth largest moon of Saturn and the 19th largest in the Solar System. Enceladus has been visited and imaged in detail by three other probes: the twin Voyager spacecraft, and the Saturn orbiting Cassini spacecraft. Out of these, Cassini investigated Enceladus in the most detail and contributed the most to the current scientific understanding of Enceladus. Cassini's 23 targeted close flybys helped discover that Enceladus is a geologically active world, with young (recently formed/solidified) terrain. The flybys also showed active, warm water plumes, along with evidence hinting at a subsurface ocean. Cassini also provided evidence of hydrothermal processes driving both the geysers and Enceladus's active geology, making the moon one of the most attractive places to find life within the solar system.

After Cassini's mission, a variety of proposals to follow-up on Cassini's findings at Enceladus. Journey to Enceladus and Titan, an astrobiology mission to Enceladus and Titan, competed for the 13th Discovery Program mission but was not selected. Later, In 2017, two Enceladus focused astrobiology missions, Enceladus Life Signatures and Habitability and Enceladus Life Finder competed for the 4th New Frontiers mission, but were ultimately not selected.

The Enceladus Orbilander proposal was created by a team led by Shannon MacKenzie to support the Planetary Science Decadal Survey. While previous mission studies had investigated multiple flybys to study Enceladus, MacKenzie's team, studying a Flagship mission architecture with a greater budget cap, decided to study an orbiter, lander, or a combination thereof. Ultimately, the decision to combine the orbiter and lander into one spacecraft was informed by Enceladus's small size and negligible gravity, which results in trivial delta-v to land.

In the 2022-2032 Planetary Decadal Survey, the Enceladus Orbilander was recommended as the second highest priority new flagship mission. The selection was motivated by proposal's exobiology and planetary habitability focus.

== Spacecraft design and instrumentation ==
Due to Enceladus's small size, the amount of energy required to land compared to capturing into orbit is negligible. Therefore, the Enceladus Orbilander is envisioned uniquely combine both the functions of an orbiter and a lander into a single spacecraft.

=== Scientific instruments ===
The proposed spacecraft will carry three separate instrument suites and a sampling system. Each instrument suite is tailored towards a different regime of science operations.

The proposed instruments are:

Instrument	Heritage Instrument (Mission)	Science Suite
High-Resolution Mass Spectrometer (HRMS)	MASPEX (Europa Clipper)	Life Detection Suite
Separation Mass Spectrometer (SMS)	Sample Analysis at Mars (Curiosity)	Life Detection Suite
Electrochemical Sensor Array (ESA)	Wet Chemistry Laboratory (Phoenix)	Life Detection Suite
Microcapillary Electrophoresis-Laser Induced Fluorescence	N/A	Life Detection Suite
Microscope	MECA Atomic Force Microscope (Phoenix)	Life Detection Suite
Solid State Nanopore Sequencer	N/A	Life Detection Suite
Narrow Angle Camera (NAC)	Long Range Reconnaissance Imager (New Horizons)	Remote Sensing and Reconnaissance Suite
Wide Angle Camera (WAC)	ECAM-M50 (Janus)	Remote Sensing and Reconnaissance Suite
Thermal Emission Spectrometer (TES)	Mercury Radiometer and Thermal Infrared Spectrometer (BepiColombo)	Remote Sensing and Reconnaissance Suite
Context Imager	Stereo Surface Imager (Phoenix)	In Situ Suite
Seismometer	Seismic Experiment for Interior Structure (Insight)	In Situ Suite

Additionally, three separate sampling systems are proposed for each stage of flight: a 1 square meter funnel to passively collect particles, a scoop for active particle collection on the surface, and a gas inlet for gas emissions.

== Mission profile ==
The Enceladus Orbilander is proposed to be launched in October 2038. The spacecraft is proposed to be launched by a Space Launch System Block II variant with a Castor 30B upper stage, although a Falcon Heavy has also been considered but would require the spacecraft to launch on a slower trajectory with flybys of Venus. The spacecraft's proposed launch is timed so that a Jupiter gravity assist can be performed in October 2040 to save propellant for Saturn orbital insertion in August 2045. In Saturn orbit, the spacecraft will embark on a complex, 4.5 year long tour of the moons of Saturn, using gravity assists off moons such as Titan, Rhea, Dione, and Tethys to lower the orbital inclination of the spacecraft. After a series of flybys with Enceladus itself, the spacecraft will enter Enceladus orbit.

The spacecraft will spend 1.5 years in a 12 hours long elliptical orbit around Enceladus. The closest point of the orbit to the surface will pass over the south polar tiger stripes to collect plume particles and remote sensing data. Whilst orbiting Enceladus, mission planners will use high resolution images and other data to determine a safe landing ellipse. When mission planners decide to land the spacecraft, the Enceladus Orbilander will lower its orbit and begin a powered descent towards the surface. The spacecraft will use terrain-relative navigation similar to systems used on OSIRIS-REx to avoid hazards during the descent. When the spacecraft is 10 metres (33 ft) above the surface, the main engine shuts off to avoid contaminating the area, and the spacecraft pitches to its side before soft landing.

== See also ==
- Abiogenesis
- Astrobiology
- Enceladus Explorer
- Enceladus Life Signatures and Habitability (ELSAH)
- Explorer of Enceladus and Titan (E^{2}T)
- Europa Clipper
- Journey to Enceladus and Titan (JET)
- Life Investigation For Enceladus (LIFE)
- THEO
