= Selection of Discovery Mission 13 and 14 =

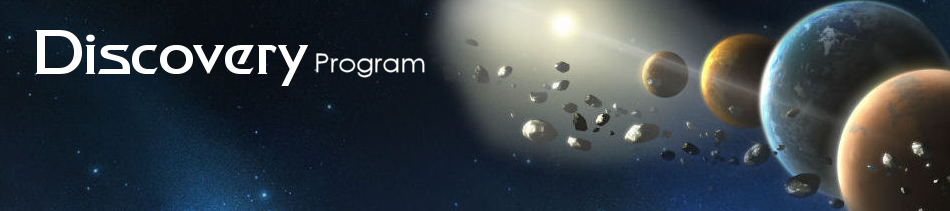
Header of the Discovery program website, as of January 2016.

The selection process for Mission 13 and 14 of the Discovery program began in February 2014, as NASA drafted an Announcement of Opportunity (AO) for the next Discovery mission. The winning mission proposals received $450 million in funding towards mission development and construction, along with bonus funding if missions were able to incorporate certain technologies. For Discovery Mission 13 and 14, NASA received 28 proposals, 16 of which notably centered around small Solar System bodies. Lucy, a multiple-flyby mission to the Jupiter trojans, and Psyche, a mission to the metallic asteroid 16 Psyche, were announced as the winners of the competition in January 2017, with launches in October 2021 and October 2023, respectively.

Both Lucy and Psyche were part of a finalist shortlist that was announced by NASA in September 2015, which also included DAVINCI, a Venus atmospheric probe, VERITAS, a Venus orbiter in the style of Magellan, and NEOCam, a space observatory focusing on the detection of potentially hazardous Near-Earth objects. It was the first time since the Discovery Mission 7 and 8 selection in 1999 that five finalists were chosen, as opposed to the traditional three. Each finalist received $3 million to develop their mission proposals, with the NEOCam concept winning additional funding from NASA at the end of the competition. It was also the first time since the selection of Discovery Mission 9 and 10 in 2001 that two missions were chosen to fly in a single round.

== Background ==
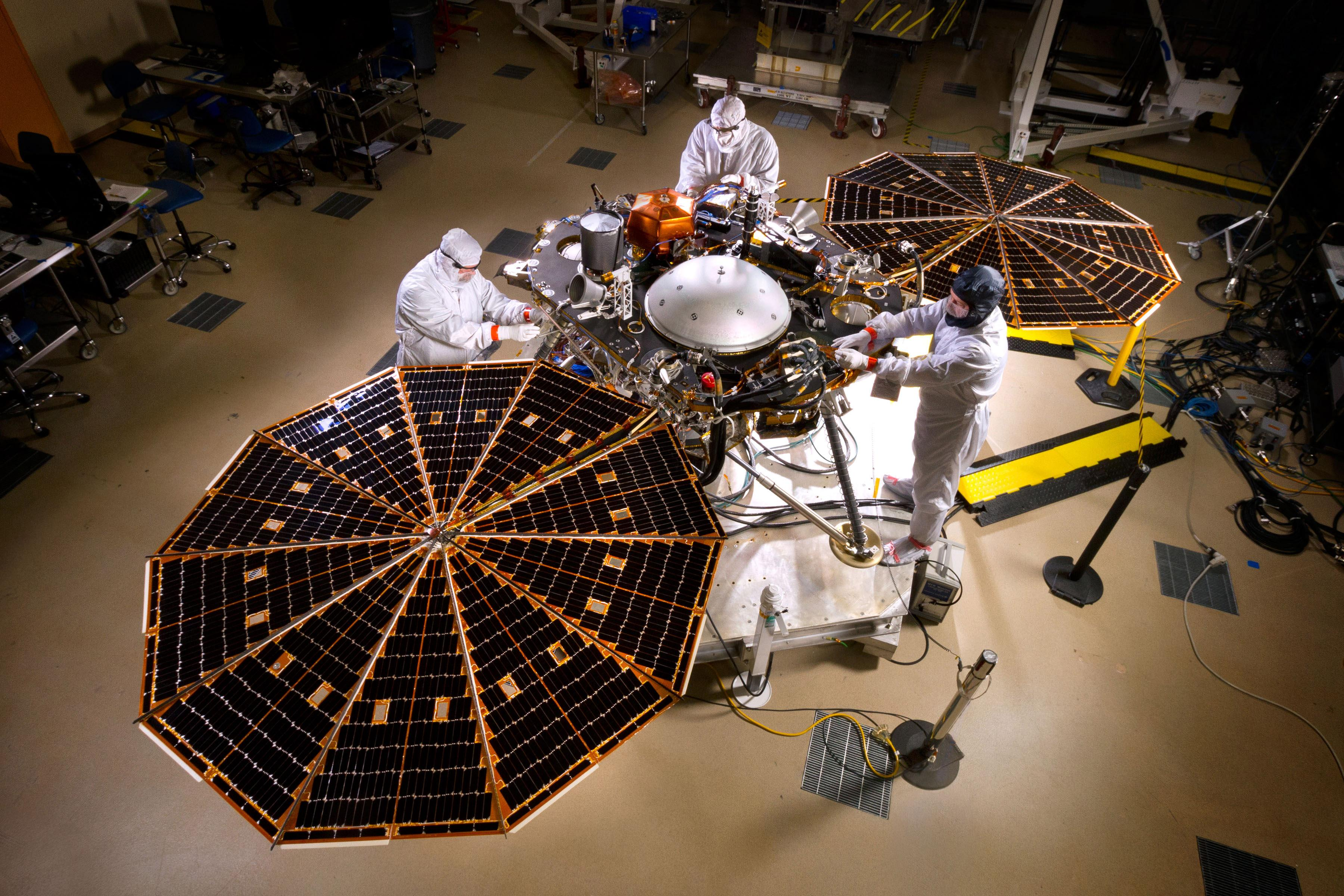
Construction of the InSight spacecraft. Its launch would be delayed to 2018, leaving a 7-year gap in Discovery program launches.

The ability for the Discovery program to launch missions on a regular basis was hampered by cuts to NASA's budget over the course of the late 2000s and early 2010s, leading to only two Announcements of Opportunities for the Discovery program in the 21st century. NASA's Small Bodies Assessment Group (SBAG), in their Visions and Voyages for Planetary Science in the Decade 2013-2022 survey published in March 2011, made a recommendation to NASA, calling to "maintain the original goals of the Discovery program" by creating a short time-frame cadence of two years between launches. They also made a recommendation to select and fund two mission concepts during each 18-24 month period, rather than one, which would ultimately result in one Discovery mission launch each year.

Prior to the call of opportunity that started the competition for the 13th Discovery mission, 11 missions had been launched in the program. The 12th mission, InSight, was delayed from its initial March 2016 launch date, following failed attempts to contain leaks in one of the spacecraft's main instruments, during numerous vacuum tests. The launch was thus delayed to May 2018 - a year after the end of the competition and two years before the launch of the 13th Discovery mission, with a cost overrun of $155 million. Concern for the cost overrun, the seven-year gap in Discovery program launches, and their effect on the program were raised, though officials at NASA insisted that the issues faced with InSight would not affect the program and the Discovery Mission 13 competition.

== Process ==
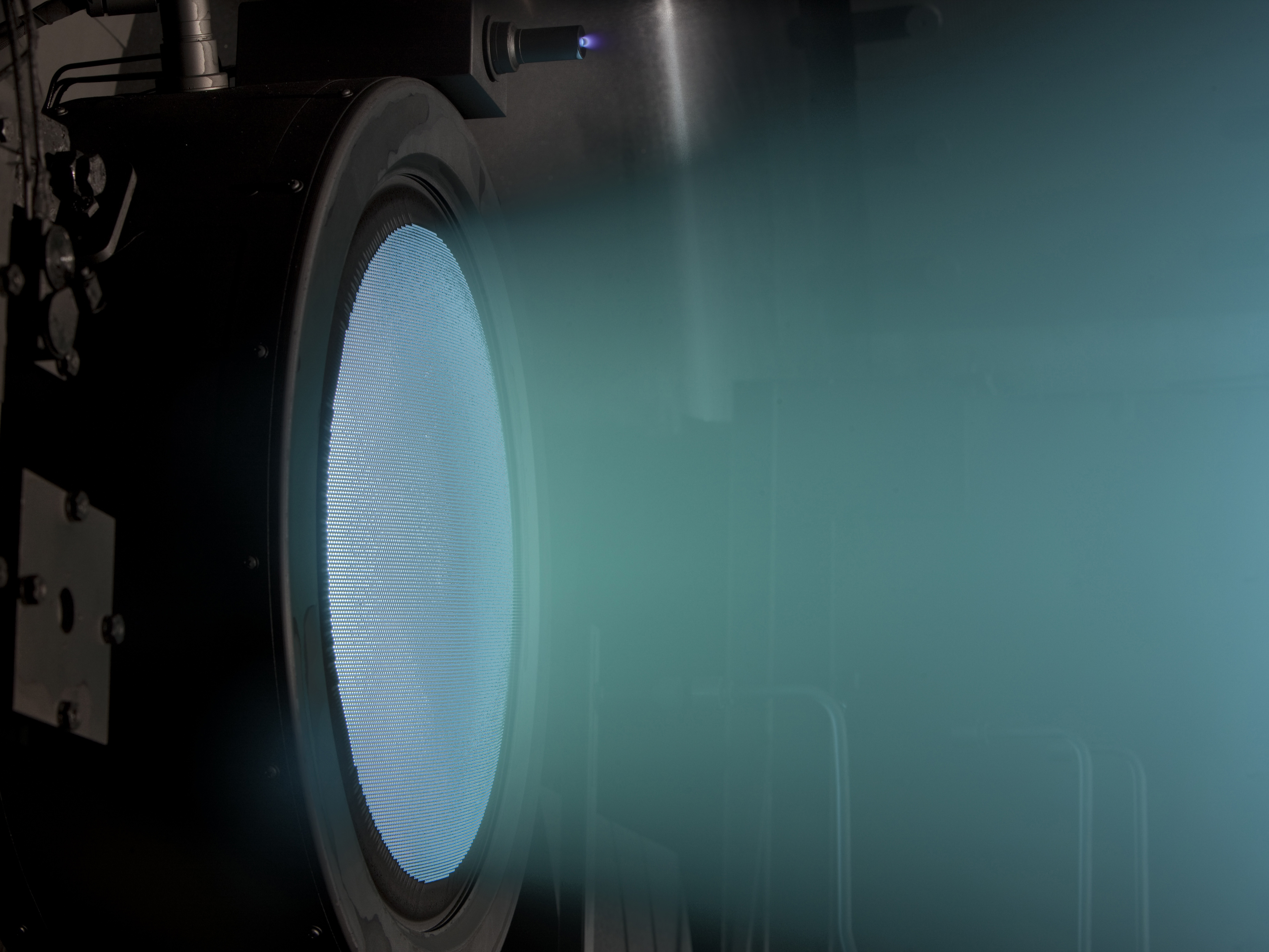
NASA made the NEXT ion thruster technology available for proposals for the thirteenth Discovery Program mission.

- An additional $10 million available if it demonstrates a 3D woven heat shield
- An additional $5 million available if it incorporates the miniaturized Deep Space Atomic Clock
- The NEXT xenon ion thruster and a radioisotope heater unit are also available for the mission without additional incentives.

For the first time, the $450 million cost cap will not include post-launch operations expenses. The final requirements were released on November 5, 2014; amongst other things they clarified the laser communication package was not a requirement but, if included, could grant a budgetary bonus.

- An additional $30 million available if it attempts to demonstrate laser communication (as opposed to radio communication) in space, by sending data with lasers beyond one lunar distance (distance from Earth to the Moon). The system is called Deep Space Optical Communications (DSOC). The device will be able to increase spacecraft communications performance and efficiency by 10 to 100 times over conventional means.

== Timeline ==
=== Announcement of Opportunity ===
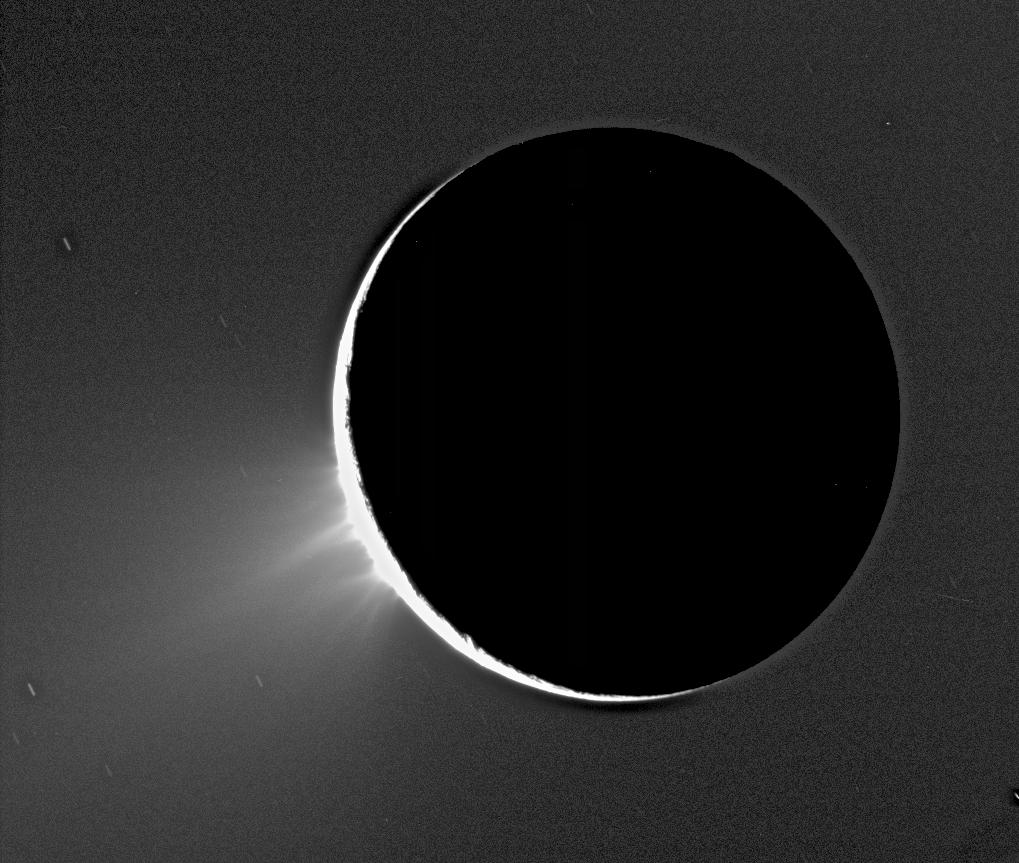
Enceladus was the target of the largely publicized Enceladus Life Finder proposal.

Following the conclusion of the Discovery Mission 12 competition, the congressional deadline for the next Announcement of Opportunity (AO) was set for May 1, 2014. The United States Congress approved of a $75 million increase in the budget for the Discovery program from the Obama Administration's original FY14 request, as with other divisions and projects at NASA. Officials from NASA's Science Mission Directorate, however, stated in January 2014 that this deadline would not be met, and that it would possibly be delayed by several months. James "Jim" Green, Director of NASA's Planetary Science Division, noted in a press conference that "they gave us the date of May 1st, and that's not realistic," stating that the deadline was not feasible in context of the declining budget allocated for the Discovery program over the past decade. A month later, a draft AO for the 13th mission of the Discovery Program was released by the Goddard Space Flight Center, outlining a process in which three finalists will be chosen to receive $3 million to further develop their proposals, with the winner receiving $450 million in funding to construct their spacecraft and operate the mission, excluding launch costs – a $50 million decrease from the $500 million in funding originally anticipated by NASA. The draft AO, which included potential financial incentives for technologies that would eventually make it into the final AO for Discovery Mission 13, such as the Heat Shield for Extreme Entry Environment Technology (HEEET) and the Deep Space Optical Communications (DSOC) The device will be able to increase spacecraft communications performance and efficiency by 10 to 100 times over conventional means. stated an anticipated release date for the final AO in September 2014 – four months after the original congressional deadline. The official text of the draft was released in full on July 2, 2014, with the final AO being released on November 5.

28 proposals for the next Discovery mission were received by NASA before its deadline of February 26, 2015. On the day of the deadline, Lockheed Martin Space Systems announced that they were supporting many of the proposals as contractors. While NASA does not disclose which proposals they receive for Discovery program missions, many mission teams went public with their proposals, through various scientific and astronomical meetings and conferences throughout the year. One particular entrant in the competition aimed at Enceladus, the astrobiology Enceladus Life Finder mission, received significant attention from news media over the course of the first round. The Io Volcano Observer was also revealed as an entrant in the competition at the 64th Lunar and Planetary Science Conference in March 2015 - its third attempt after previously entering in the competitions for Discovery Mission 12 and New Frontiers Mission 3. A number of proposals targeting minor planets were also unveiled by their respective teams through briefings held at the NASA Small Bodies Assessment Group's three-hour meeting on June 30, 2015. During the meeting, three more contractors were revealed as supporting numerous entrants in the competition – Ball Aerospace, Boeing Defense, Space & Security, and Orbital ATK. A notable event that occurred during the competition's first round was the September 2015 announcement of NASA's termination of involvement with the B612 Foundation's Sentinel Space Telescope, an infrared space observatory focused on discovering a number of new Near-Earth objects (NEOs). The mostly similar NEOCam proposal, which was also a NEO-seeking infrared space observatory mission, sought to benefit from the termination of NASA's involvement with Sentinel by acting as a suitable replacement mission.

=== Finals and selection ===
This time next year, when the [final proposals] come in and we do the analysis, there's a criteria [sic] on whether we'll be able to select one or two, and that criteria is, of course, a budgetary one. It's also how well they do. They have to demonstrate their ability to stay within the cost cap.

— James L. Green, Director of the Planetary Science Division, NASA

In September 2015, out of the numerous proposals sent to NASA for consideration, five were officially chosen for selection to participate in the competition's final round. The selections included DAVINCI and VERITAS, two spacecraft targeted at Venus; a planet NASA had not visited since 1994 with Magellan. Also selected were Psyche and Lucy, two missions targeted at asteroids, and NEOcam, a space observatory focused on Near-Earth objects. This is the first time since the selection of Discovery Mission 7 and 8, back in 1999, that five missions were selected to be finalists; typically only three are chosen to compete. The reasoning behind this, according to NASA, was to open up the possibility of selecting two missions, instead of one, to fund and launch. Site visits by NASA personnel of the proposed operations and manufacturing centers of each of the five proposed missions occurred in November and December 2016. In particular, Karin Valentine of the Arizona State University recounted 30 representatives of NASA arriving at Space Systems Loral, the proposed manufacturing site for the Psyche mission, spending nine hours interviewing staff and members of the mission team during their site visit. Principal investigator Linda Elkins-Tanton stated that the Psyche team had spent up to six months preparing for the visit, though remarking that "was almost not enough time [...] presenting answers to these complex and technical questions about our mission really took the team of about 140 people many long and hard-worked days."

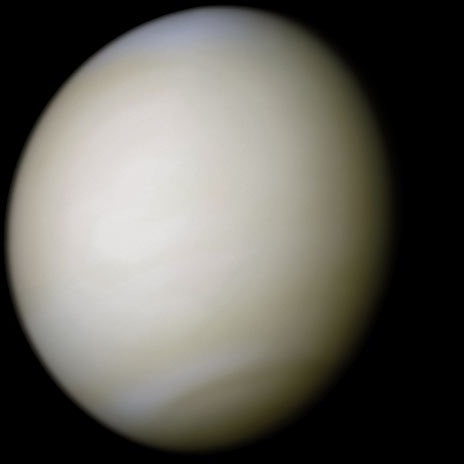
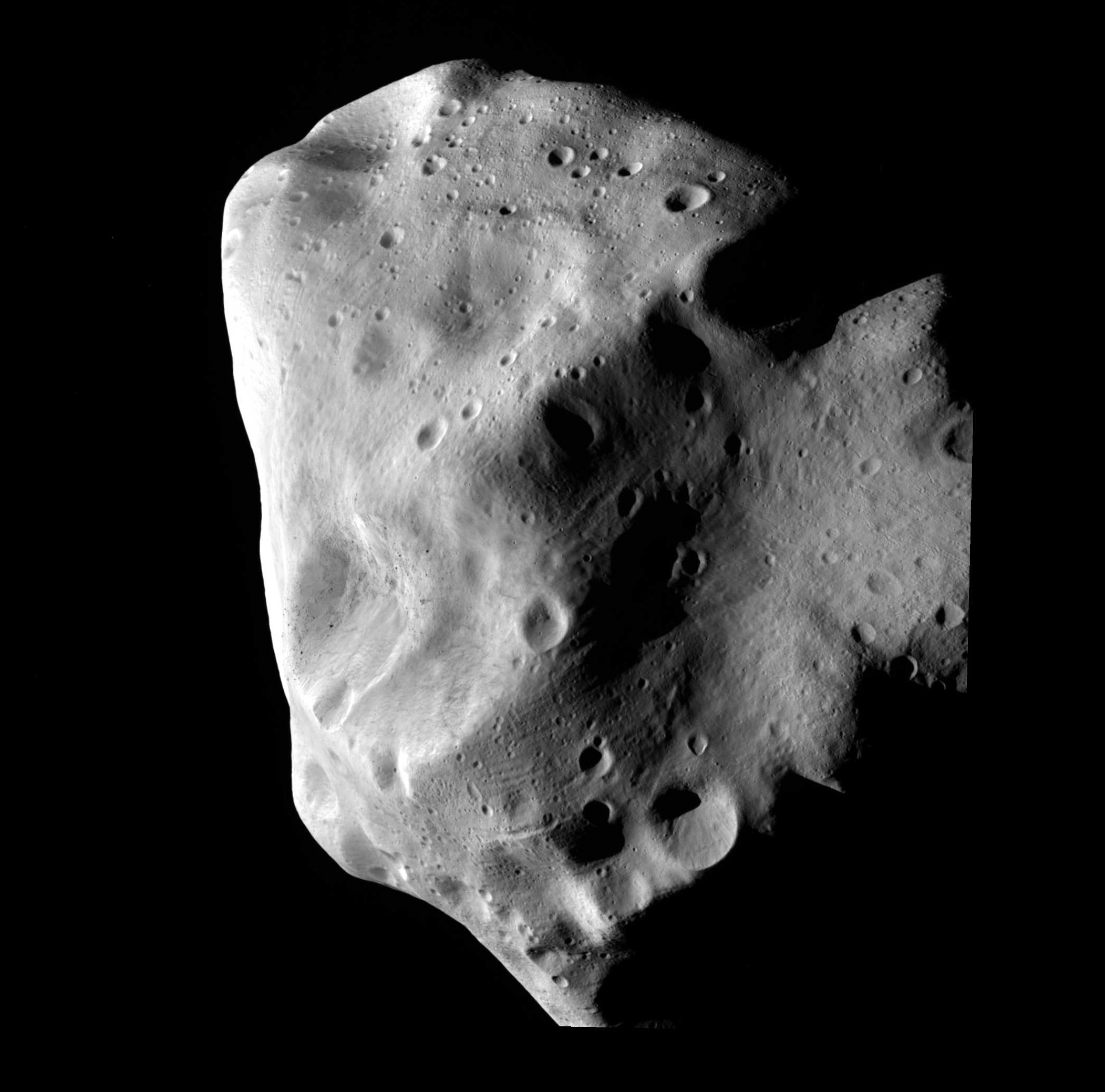
Venus and asteroids were the two common themes among the finalists of the Discovery Mission 13 and 14 competition.

Throughout the year of the final, renewed focus and attention was drawn on Venus, following the selection of DAVINCI and VERITAS. Contemporary public and media interest in Venus had escalated after the successful second orbital insertion attempt of Akatsuki in December 2015, and its subsequent early data returns from the planet through the year afterward. Both VERITAS and DAVINCI were featured prominently in the media during this time, through recent discoveries concerning volcanism on the planet, and a frigid cold layer in Venus atmosphere; both subjects of interest to each respective mission. In addition, the missions were also treated features in journals and websites such as Nature, and Universe Today. Psyche was also publicized in the media in the final months leading up to the selection, after evidence for water on 16 Psyche, the target of the mission, was discovered in October 2016.

The press conference convened to publicly reveal the winner of the competition on January 4, 2017 was announced the day earlier, after two delays from original selection dates in September and December 2016. The winners of the competition, Lucy and Psyche, were announced via a press release two hours before the conference. An additional end result of the competition was also an additional year of funding for proposal development for NEOCam under a "Phase A" study. Jim Green stated that the selection of the missions were a part of NASA's "larger strategy of investigating how the Solar System formed and evolved", describing asteroids and minor planets as the "additional pieces of the puzzle [that will] help us understand how the sun and its family of planets formed, changed over time, and became places where life could develop and be sustained, and what the future may hold."

== Mission proposals ==
The deadline for proposals was February 16, 2015 and may have included some of the following mission candidates:

Saturn system

- Enceladus Life Finder (ELF) — an astrobiology orbiter mission to assess Enceladus' habitability and search for biosignatures.
- Journey to Enceladus and Titan (JET) — an astrobiology orbiter mission to assess Enceladus' habitability and search for biosignatures in the plumes.
- Life Investigation For Enceladus (LIFE) — an astrobiology sample-return mission to assess Enceladus' habitability and search for biosignatures in a sample of a plume.

Jupiter system

- Io Volcano Observer — a mission to explore Io's active volcanism and impact on the Jupiter system as a whole by measuring its global heat flow, its induced magnetic field, the temperature of its lava, and the composition of its atmosphere, volcanic plumes, and lavas.
- Advanced Jovian Asteroid eXplorer (AJAX) — a mission to a single Jupiter trojan

Venus

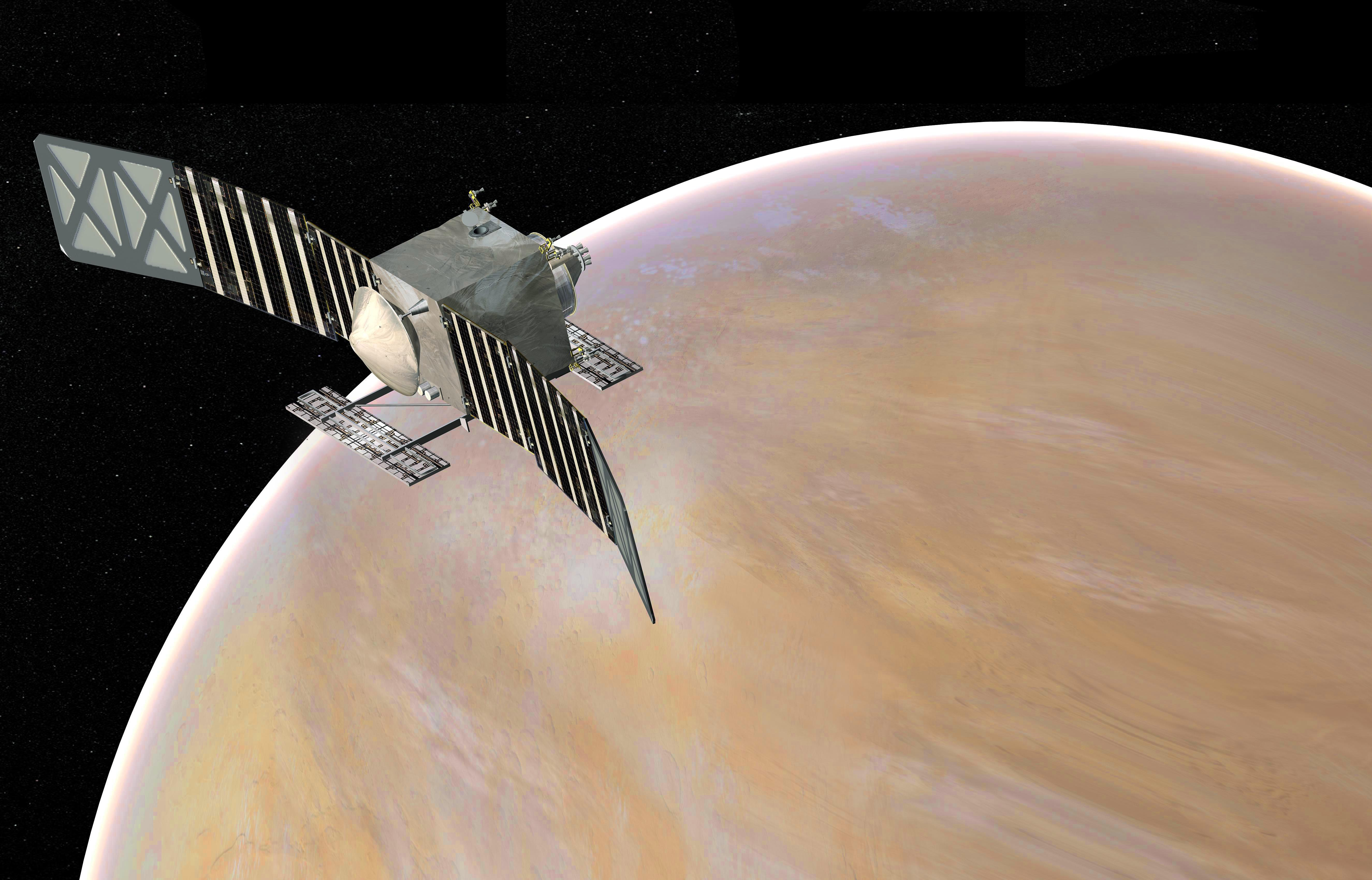
Concept art of VERITAS orbiter at Venus

- Deep Atmosphere Venus Investigation of Noble gases, Chemistry, and Imaging (DAVINCI)− Atmospheric probe to Venus that would study the chemical composition of its atmosphere during a 63-minute descent. Selected as one of five finalists in September 2015.
- Radar at Venus (RAVEN) - High-resolution mapping of Venus
- Venus Atmosphere and Surface Explorer (VASE)— would measure the complete inventory of atmospheric noble gas and light stable isotopes and provide the first complete atmospheric structure profile from clouds to surface of temperature, pressure and wind.
- Venus Emissivity, Radio Science, InSAR Topography and Spectroscopy (VERITAS)— Orbiter that would produce global, high resolution topography and imaging of Venus' surface and global surface composition. Selected as one of five finalists in September 2015.

Mars system

- Mars-Moons Exploration, Reconnaissance and Landed Investigation (MERLIN) mission to flyby Deimos and then orbit and land on Phobos.
- Phobos And Deimos Origin Assessment (PANDORA), to orbit Deimos and Phobos
- Phobos And Deimos & Mars Environment (PADME)
- Icebreaker Life would use the Phoenix/InSight platform but would carry a payload to search for past extraterrestrial life on Mars.

Asteroid, comet, and lunar proposals

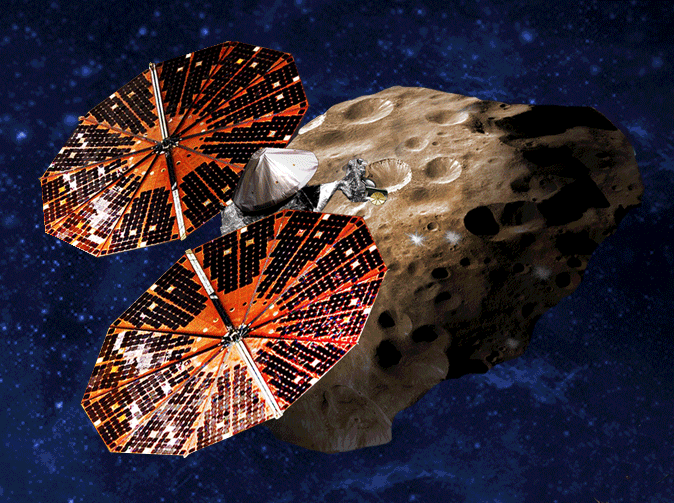
Lucy concept art

- Binary Asteroid in-situ Explorer (BASiX)— a mission to visit a binary asteroid and set off small explosions to see how they affect the movement of both objects.
- Comet Radar Explorer (CORE)
- Dark Asteroid Rendezvous (DARe)— a mission to visit up to nine asteroids using a spacecraft equipped with ion propulsion.
- Lucy — would perform the first reconnaissance of the Jupiter trojan asteroids. Some possible reported targets would be 3548 Eurybates, 21900 Orus, 11351 Leucus, the binary 617 Patroclus with its companion Menoetius, and main-belt asteroid 52246 Donaldjohanson. Selected as one of five finalists in September 2015.
- Moon Age and Regolith Explorer (MARE)
- NanoSWARM — CubeSat mission to study space weathering, lunar magnetism, lunar water and small-scale magnetospheres.
- Near-Earth Object Camera (NEOCam)— is a space infrared telescope designed to survey the Solar System for potentially hazardous asteroids. Selected as one of five finalists in September 2015.
- Proteus – mission to 238P/Read, a main-belt comet
- Psyche — orbiter to 16 Psyche, the most massive metallic asteroid in the asteroid belt, thought to be exposed iron core of a protoplanet. Selected as one of five finalists in September 2015.
- Kuiper Telescope — this would target multiple objects, including the giant planets, their satellites, and small bodies with a 1.2-meter diameter mirror space telescope placed at Earth L2 point.

=== Finalists ===
Spacecraft art	Name	Institution	Principal Investigator	Target
	Lucy	(Colorado) Southwest Research Institute, Boulder	Harold F. Levison	Jupiter trojans
Lucy is reconnaissance mission to send a spacecraft on a tour of at least five of the Jupiter trojans in a multiple-flyby effort lasting from 2021 to a final flyby in 2032. The spacecraft will perform observations of each trojan asteroid's geology, surface features, compositions, masses and densities, in order to enable study on the formation and evolution of the Solar System. The mission will make use of the Deep Space Atomic Clock.
	Psyche	Arizona State University	Linda Elkins-Tanton	16 Psyche
Psyche, an asteroid belt mission, aims to send a spacecraft to the M-type asteroid 16 Psyche. The spacecraft will study the asteroid, believed to be the exposed core of an early Solar System protoplanet from orbit, with the goal of better understanding the processes of the early formation of the Solar System; studies not possible on existing planetary bodies, due to geologic activity. The primary mission will last six months, focusing on studies of the asteroid's gravity, composition and topography. In addition, the spacecraft will use a solar electric propulsion system, similar to Dawn. However, Psyche will use a Hall-effect thruster unlike the Kaufman thruster used by Dawn
N/A	DAVINCI	(Maryland) Goddard Space Flight Center	Lori Glaze	Venus
N/A	Deep Atmosphere Venus Investigation of Noble gases, Chemistry, and Imaging (DAVINCI) is a mission to send an atmospheric probe through the Atmosphere of Venus, and study it during a 63-minute descent. A successor to the Pioneer Venus Multiprobe and Venera missions, studies will focus on finding evidence for the existence of active volcanoes on Venus, building on findings from both Pioneer Venus and Venus Express, and focusing on sulfur dioxide signatures.			
	NEOCam	(California) Jet Propulsion Laboratory	Amy Mainzer	Near-Earth objects
Near-Earth Object Camera (NEOCam) is a space observatory mission, similar in design and concept to the Kepler space telescope, that will hunt for and identify potentially hazardous Near-Earth objects (NEOs). The team's scientists say that they will be able to discover at least ten times the amount of NEOs than all currently known, with the main objective being to characterize two thirds of the amount of asteroids over 140 metres (460 ft) in diameter estimated to exist in the main belt, over the course of its four-year primary mission. One of the technologies aboard the spacecraft is an advanced infrared sensor that had been in development at the Jet Propulsion Laboratory for more than a decade. The project's principal investigator, Amy Mainzer, was also the principal investigator of the NEOWISE mission of the Wide-field Infrared Survey Explorer (WISE), a similar mission that observed minor planets in near-earth orbits. This will be the mission's second attempt at being funded by the Discovery program; it was originally submitted to NASA during the selection of Discovery Mission 11 in 2006, but was not chosen as a finalist.
	VERITAS	(California) Jet Propulsion Laboratory	Suzanne Smrekar	Venus
Venus Emissivity, Radio Science, InSAR, Topography, and Spectroscopy (VERITAS) aims to place a spacecraft in orbit of Venus to study the planet's surface through high-resolution radar imagery, effectively succeeding Magellan. The imagery would be obtained by using an X band radar configured as a single pass interferometric synthetic aperture radar (InSAR), coupled with a multispectral near-infrared (NIR) emissivity mapping capability. The main objective of the mission is to study the past geology of Venus, and whether or not it once would have supported life, along with other in-depth studies, such as the planet's tectonic and volcanic history, and searching for evidence of a possible resurfacing event in Venus' recent past.

=== Submissions ===
For the competition to select the 13th Discovery mission, 28 proposals were submitted to NASA from various institutions; roughly the same number of proposals received during the competition for the 12th Discovery mission in 2011. 16 of these proposals were notably focused on small Solar System bodies, including asteroids, comets, kuiper belt objects, and planetary moons. 27 of the 28 proposals were disclosed to the public before finalists were chosen in September 2015:

Moon

- Moon Age and Regolith Explorer (MARE)
- NanoSWARM

Inner Solar System

- Icebreaker Life
- Mars Moon Exploration, Reconnaissance, and Landed Investigation (MERLIN)
- Phobos And Deimos & Mars Environment (PADME)
- Phobos and Deimos Origin Assessment (PANDORA)
- Radar At Venus (RAVEN)
- Venus Atmosphere and Surface Explorer (VASE)

Outer Solar System

- Enceladus Life Finder
- Io Volcano Observer
- Journey to Enceladus and Titan (JET)
- Life Investigation For Enceladus (LIFE)

Minor planets

- Advanced Jovian Asteroid Explorer (AJAX)
- Binary Asteroid In-Situ Explorer (BASiX)
- Comet Hartley Analysis to Gather Ancient Links to Life
- Comet Radar Explorer (CORE)
- Dark Asteroid Rendezvous (DARe)
- Main Belt Asteroid and NEO Tour With Imaging and Spectroscopy
- Primitive Material Explorer
- Proteus

Kuiper belt and beyond

- Kuiper
- Whipple
