= Tiger stripes =

Tiger stripes may refer to:

- The stripes on a tiger
- Tiger stripes (Enceladus), geological formations on one of Saturn's moons
- Tiger Stripes (film), a 2023 body horror film
- Tiger stripe camouflage, a group of camouflage patterns
