= Life Investigation For Enceladus =

Proposed astrobiology mission

Life Investigation For Enceladus (LIFE) was a proposed astrobiology mission concept that would capture icy particles from Saturn's moon Enceladus and return them to Earth, where they could be studied in detail for signs of life such as biomolecules.

The LIFE orbiter concept was proposed by a team led by Peter Tsou to NASA's 13th Discovery Mission solicitation, but the mission was not selected by NASA for Phase-A design study.

== Mission concept ==
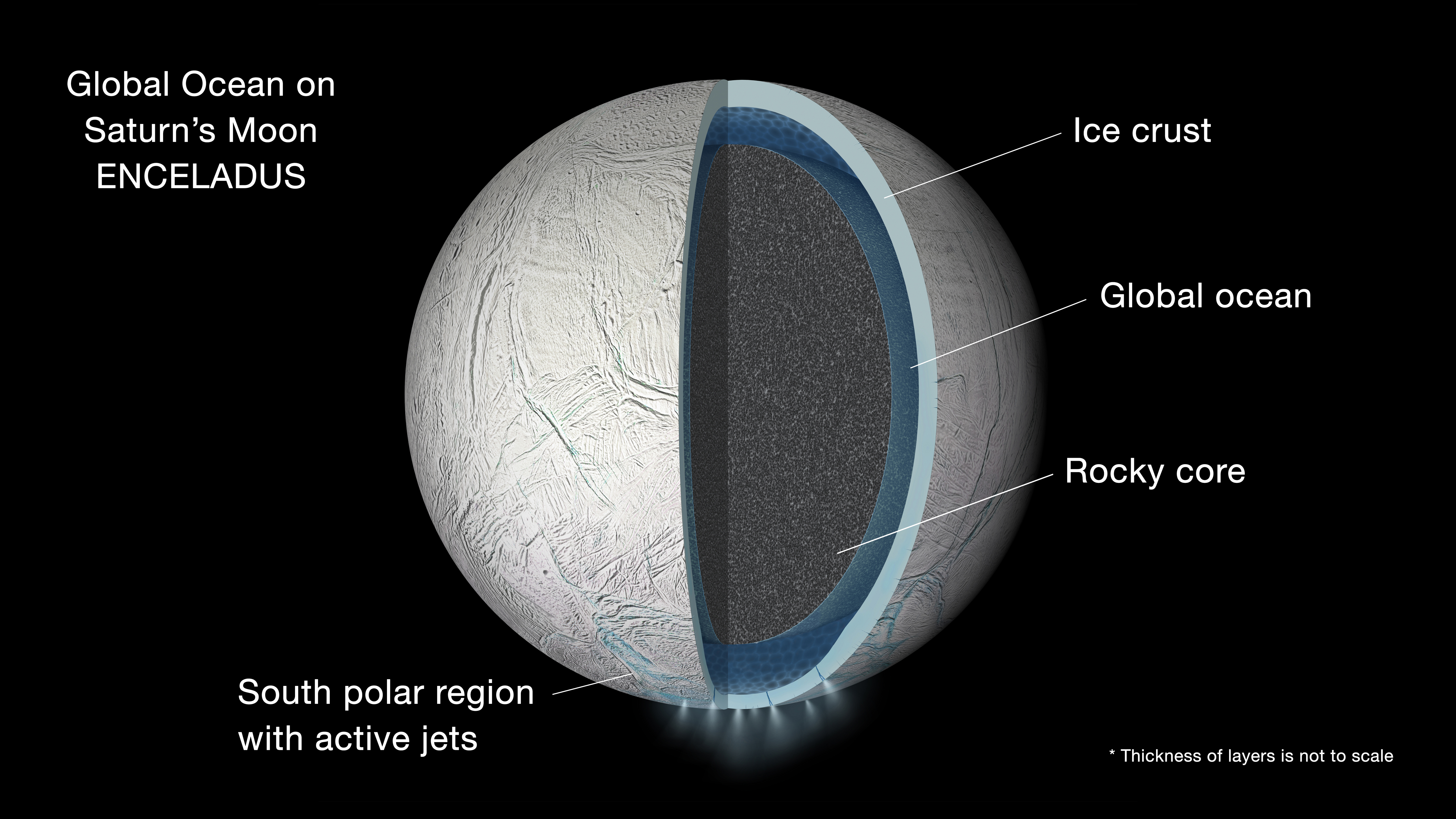
Artist's impression of possible hydrothermal activity on Enceladus.

Enceladus is a small icy moon with jets or geysers of water erupting from its surface that might be connected to active hydrothermal vents at its subsurface water ocean floor, where the moon's ocean meets the underlying rock, a prime habitat for life. The geysers could provide easy access for sampling the moon's subsurface ocean, and if there is microbial life in it, ice particles from the sea could contain the evidence astrobiologists need to identify them.

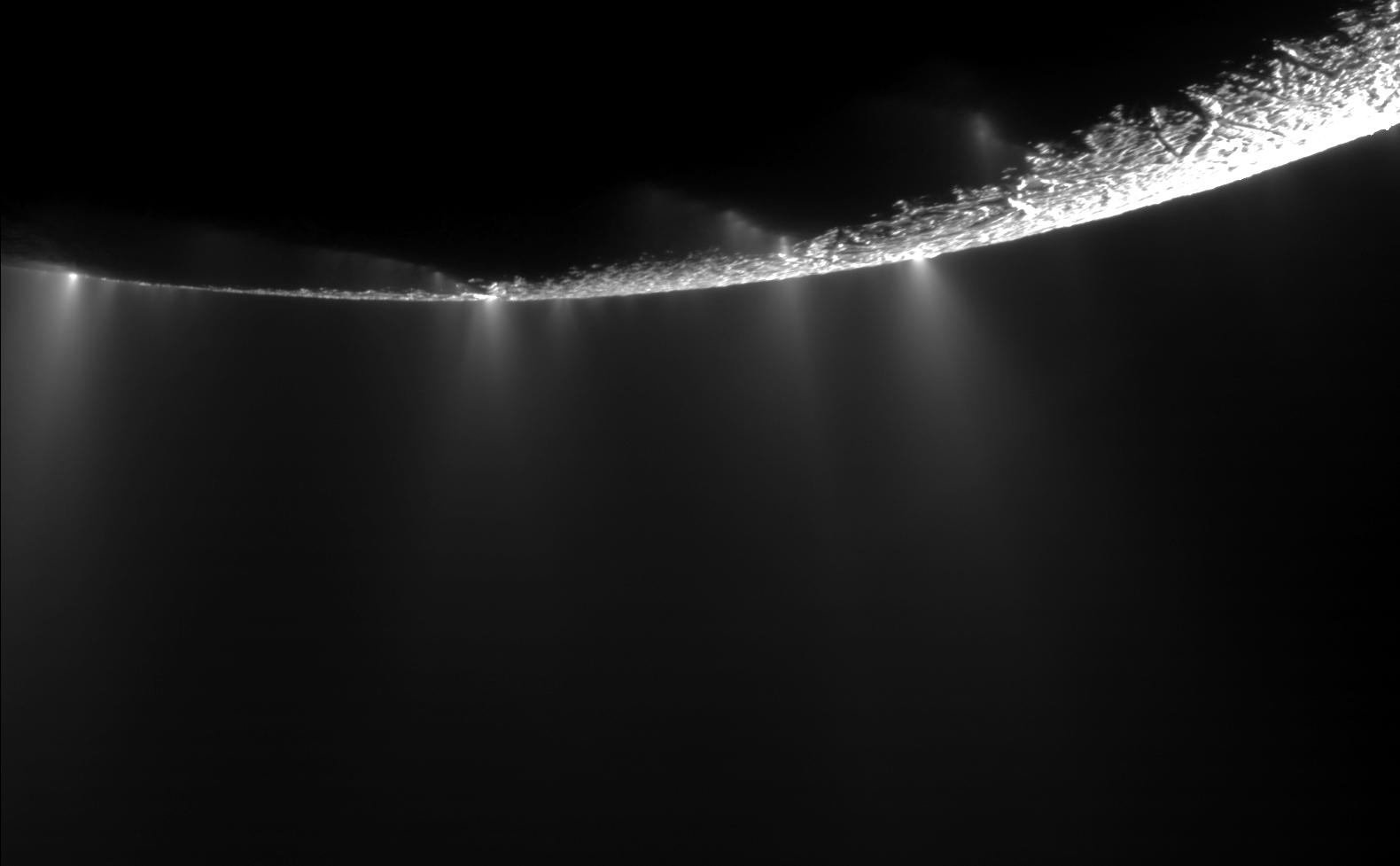
Enceladus's south pole - Geysers spray water from many locations along the 'tiger stripes' feature.

The 15-year LIFE mission would use a 'Tanpopo' aerogel collector similar to the one NASA used in the Stardust sample return mission to return cometary dust in 2006. The proposed spacecraft would enter into Saturn orbit and enable multiple flybys through Enceladus's icy plumes. After spending about two years in orbit as slow as 2 km/s around Saturn, LIFE would use its propulsion system to escape Saturn and begin the ~4.5 year long voyage back to Earth with the collected particles in a return capsule. The spacecraft may sample Enceladus's plume, the E ring of Saturn, and the Titan upper atmosphere.

In December 2014, NASA announced that it would be selecting finalists in June 2015 to submit proposals for a future Discovery Program mission, and selecting a winning proposal in September 2016. The selected mission must launch by the end of 2021. The mission would have a $425 million development cost cap, and it would reach Saturn after a series of gravity assists past Venus and the Earth. Samples from Enceladus's plume would make it to Earth about 14 years later. In September 2016, NASA announced that five proposals had been selected for further study.

== Science payload ==
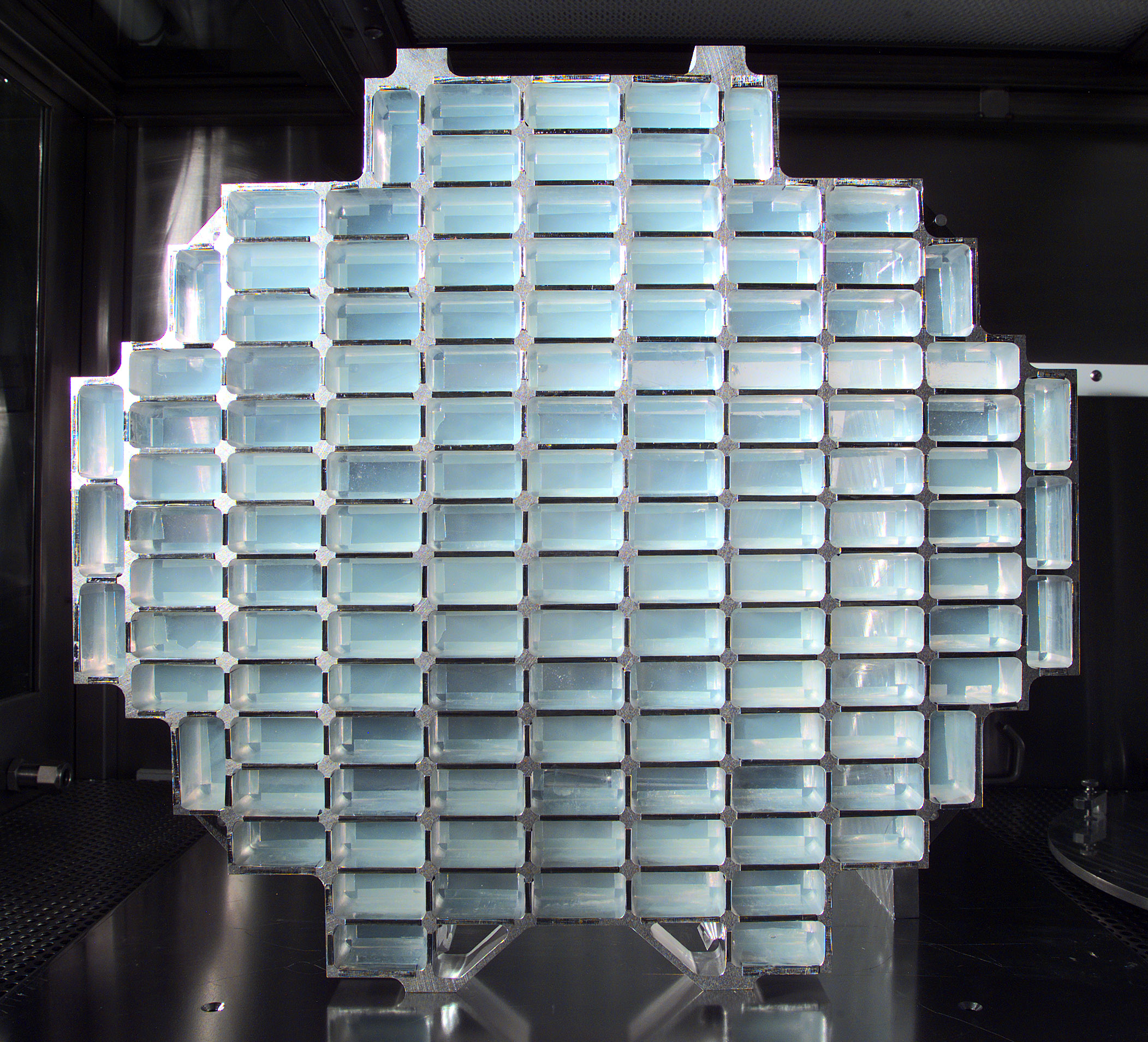
The Stardust dust collector with aerogel blocks

As currently envisioned, the probe's science payload would consist of:

- an aerogel collector — for the capture of particles at 2 km/s
- a tool for collecting volatile chemicals
- a mass spectrometer — CHIMPS, an upgraded ROSINA on Rosetta spacecraft
- a camera — optical navigation shared with science to observe the dynamics of the jets
- a dust counter — to confirm the flux of the jet particles encountered by the collectors

The samples collected would be returned to Earth for extensive analyses.

== See also ==
- Abiogenesis
- Discovery Program
- Enceladus Explorer
- Enceladus Life Finder
- Europa Clipper
- Explorer of Enceladus and Titan (E^{2}T)
- Journey to Enceladus and Titan
- THEO
