= Kraken Catena =

Crater chain on Triton

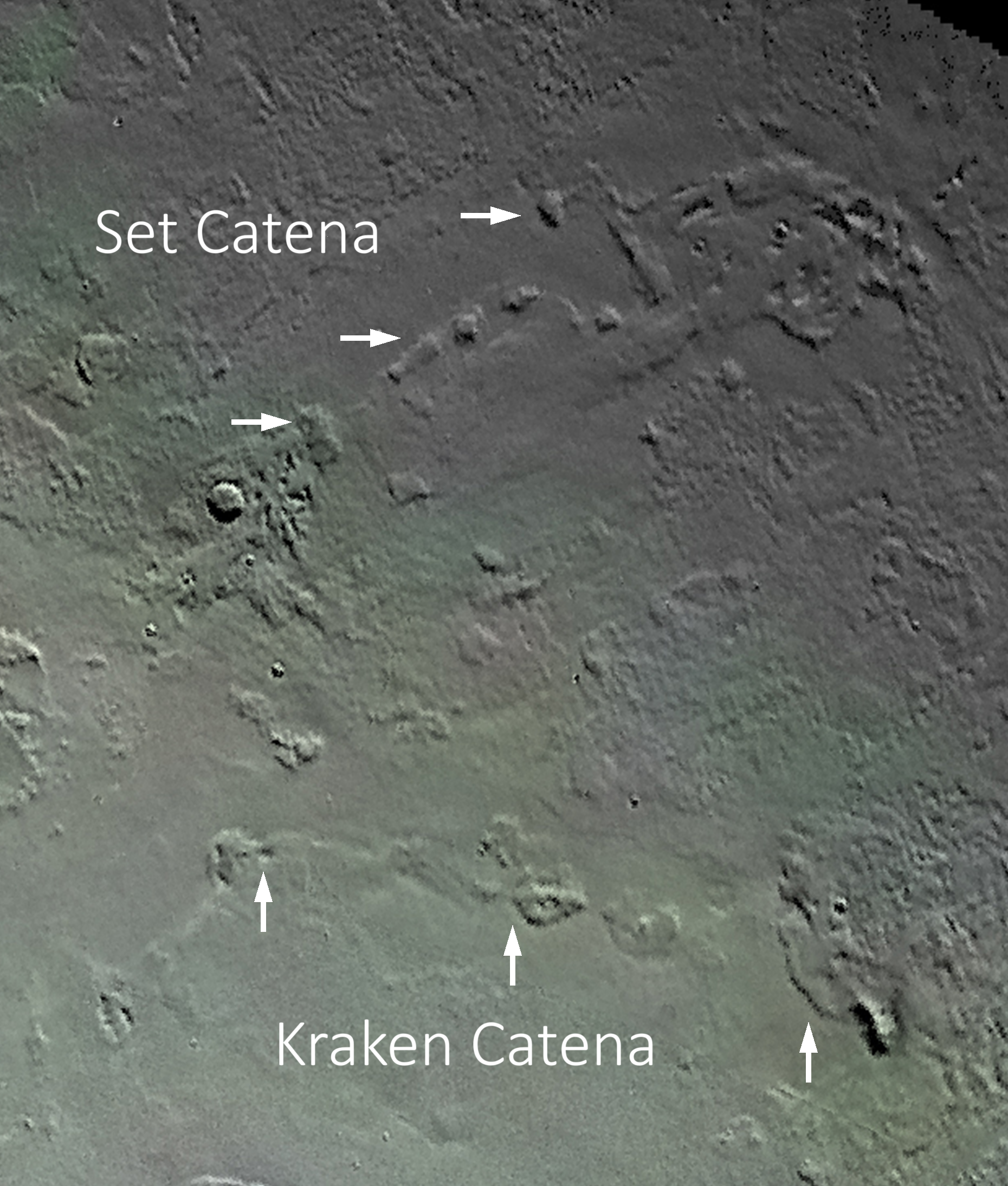
- Kraken Catena and nearby Set Catena, highlighted with arrows. The two pit chains are aligned radially from nearby Leviathan Patera
- Feature type: Crater chain, tectonic rift
- Location: Monad Regio, Triton
- Coordinates: 14.00°N 35.50°E
- Discoverer: Voyager 2
- Eponym: Kraken

Kraken Catena is a pit chain (catena) and likely tectonic fault on Triton, the largest natural satellite of Neptune. It, along with Set Catena, is located near and is aligned approximately radially from Leviathan Patera, a major cryovolcanic feature; as such, Kraken Catena may have played a role in rift-induced cryovolcanic activity in Leviathan Patera. Several of Kraken Catena's pits have central steep-sided knobs, giving a moated appearance similar to the moated mountains found on Pluto's moon Charon and Uranus's moon Ariel.

As with all other surface features of Triton, Kraken Catena was discovered when Voyager 2 visited the Neptune system on 25 August 1989. It is named after the Kraken of Norse mythology; the name was officially approved by the International Astronomical Union (IAU) in 1991. It is located at 14°N, 35.5°E, within Cipango Planum and Monad Regio.

== See also ==
- List of geological features on Triton
- Geology of Triton
