= Triton Hopper =

Proposed NASA Triton lander space probe

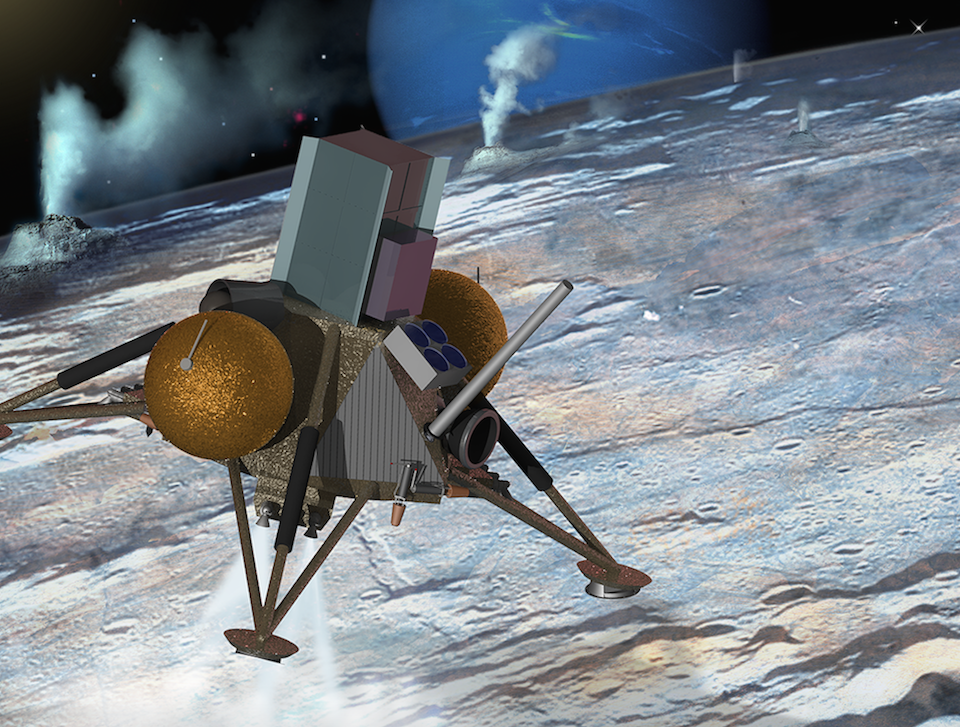
- Artist's concept of the Triton Hopper
- Mission type: Reconnaissance
- Operator: NASA

Spacecraft properties
- Spacecraft type: Robotic
- Dry mass: 500 kg

Triton lander

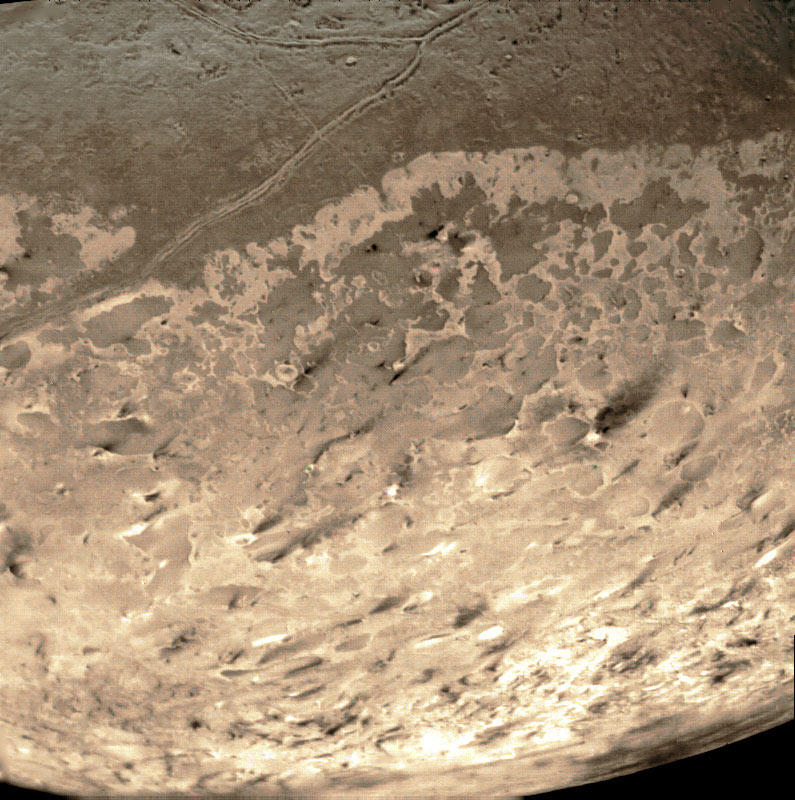
Dark streaks across Triton's south polar cap surface, thought to be dust deposits left by eruptions of nitrogen geysers

Triton Hopper is a concept NASA lander to Triton, the largest moon of Neptune. The idea is to harvest the abundant nitrogen ice on the surface of Triton and use it as propellant for multiple short flights and explore a variety of locations. The concept was promoted to Phase II in March 2018 to refine their designs and explore aspects of implementing the new technology.

== History ==
Triton is the largest moon of Neptune. In 1989, Voyager 2 flew past the moon at a distance of 40,000 km, and discovered several cryovolcanoes on its surface. Triton is geologically active; its surface is young and has relatively few impact craters. It has a very thin atmosphere.

The Triton Hopper concept started Phase I in 2015, and it then moved in March 2018 to Phase II, where the new technologies are being developed by NASA's Institute for Advanced Concepts (NIAC).

== Overview ==
The Triton Hopper concept proposes the use of a radioisotope rocket engine that would collect nitrogen ice on or below the surface, heat it under pressure and use it as propellant to explore Neptune's moon Triton. The largest technological challenge is to learn how to mine local surface nitrogen ice, and how to heat it for use as propellant. The rocket-powered hops are estimated to be up to 1 km high and 5 km long.

A rocket-powered vehicle, or "hopper", has several advantages due to the variety of terrain and a gravity of only 8% of that of Earth. Hemispheric traverses and atmospheric sampling are possible during hops.

While it is airborne, the craft would acquire images and videos during flight. While it's on the ground, it could photograph and analyse the chemistry and geology of the surface. It could potentially fly through geysers on Triton's surface to analyse the material ejected from them.

== See also ==
- Comet Hopper
- Europa Lander (NASA)
- Trident, a flyby proposal to Triton
- Pluto Hop, Skip, and Jump, a very similar proposal
