= Amanda Hendrix =

American planetary scientist

Amanda R. Hendrix
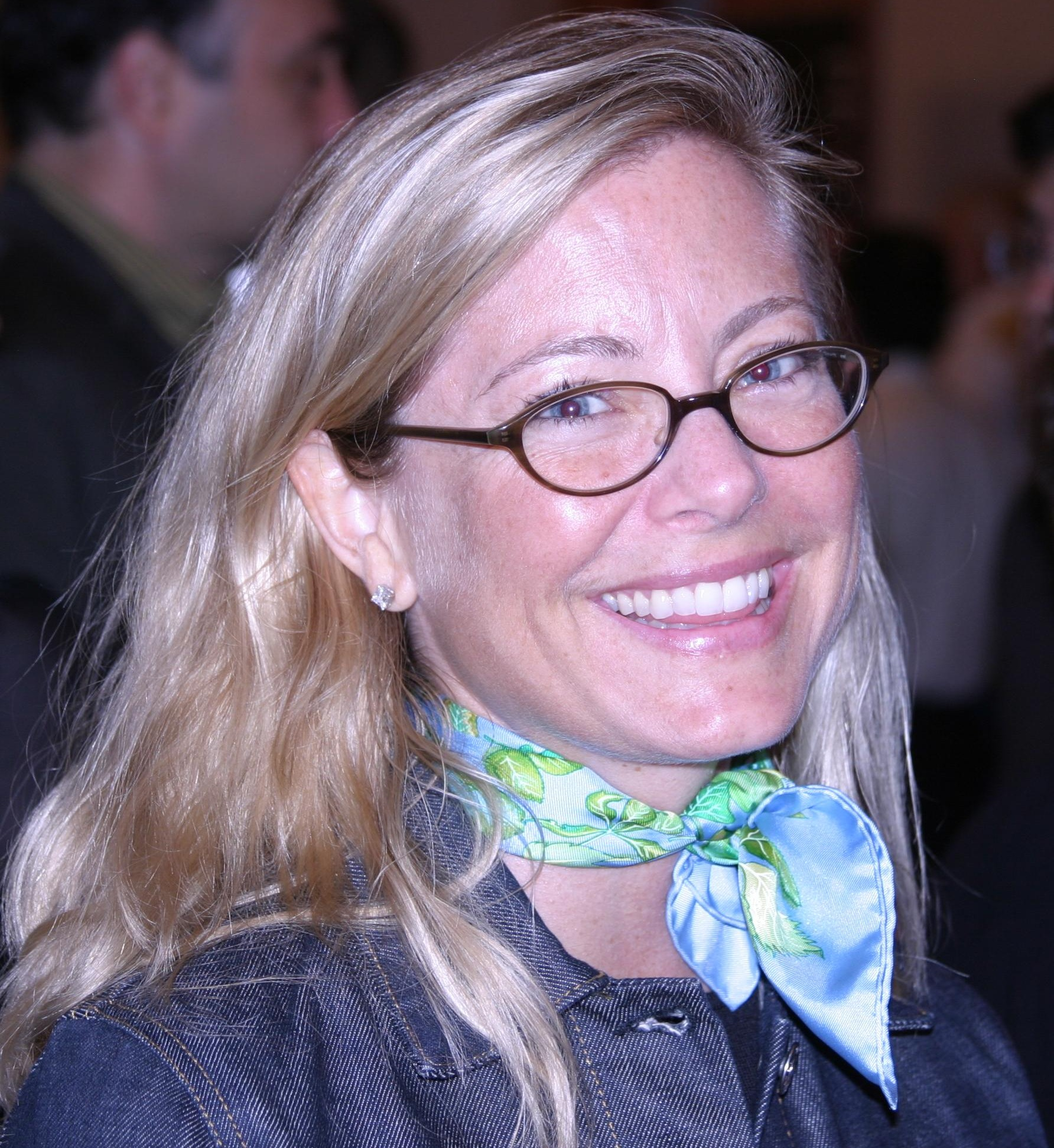
- Born: May 21, 1968 (age 58)
- Citizenship: US
- Education: California Polytechnic State University, San Luis Obispo; University of Colorado, Boulder
- Known for: ultraviolet spectroscopy
- Awards: JPL Lew Allen Award for Excellence, 2006
- Scientific career
- Fields: planetary science, solar system astronomy
- Workplaces: Planetary Science Institute; Jet Propulsion Laboratory; Laboratory for Atmospheric and Space Physics, University of Colorado
- Doctoral advisor: Charles A. Barth

Amanda R. Hendrix (May 21, 1968) is an American planetary scientist known for her pioneering studies of Solar System bodies at ultraviolet wavelengths. She is director and CEO of the Planetary Science Institute. Her research interests include moon and asteroid surface composition, space weathering effects and radiation products. She is a co-investigator on the Cassini UVIS instrument, was a co-investigator on the Galileo UVS instrument, is a Participating Scientist on the Lunar Reconnaissance Orbiter LAMP instrument and is a Principal Investigator on Hubble Space Telescope observing programs. As of 2019, she is also the co-lead of the NASA Roadmaps to Oceans World Group.

Before moving to PSI, Hendrix worked for 12 years at Jet Propulsion Laboratory in the Comets, Asteroids and Satellites Group. She was the Deputy Project Scientist for the Cassini–Huygens mission (2010-2012).

Hendrix was a NASA astronaut candidate finalist in 2000.

She received a B.S. in Aeronautical Engineering from Cal Poly, San Luis Obispo and an M.S. and Ph.D. in Aerospace Engineering Sciences from the University of Colorado Boulder.

Since 2024 she has been the editor-in-chief of the Journal of Geophysical Research E: Planets.

== Awards and honors ==
Hendrix was awarded the Lew Allen Award for Excellence in 2006. Asteroid 6813 Amandahendrix was named in her honor. The official naming citation was published by the Minor Planet Center on 25 September 2018 (M.P.C. 111797).

She was named a Fellow of the American Astronomical Society in 2024, "for wide-ranging studies illuminating thermal, irradiative, and exogenic processing of various species on small body surfaces in the Solar System; management of complex autonomous science systems; and devoted service to the planetary and space science communities".

== Media and outreach ==
While at JPL, Hendrix wrote several blog posts on Cassini results and participated in Cassini Scientist for a Day on several occasions. Hendrix gave a Von Karman lecture (Enceladus: The newest wrinkle from Saturn's tiger-striped moon) in Pasadena in 2008 and the Kepler lecture (Lunar Exploration: From the Apollo Era to the Future) at Mt. San Antonio College in 2013. She has appeared on several episodes of the History Channel's The Universe and the Discovery Channel's How the Universe Works. She spoke at the Griffith Observatory's Cassini Program in 2009 and has written for the Planetary Report

Hendrix has taught undergraduate and graduate level courses at Cal Poly, Pomona, Mt. San Antonio College and University of Colorado Boulder.
