= Leviathan Patera =

Caldera on Triton

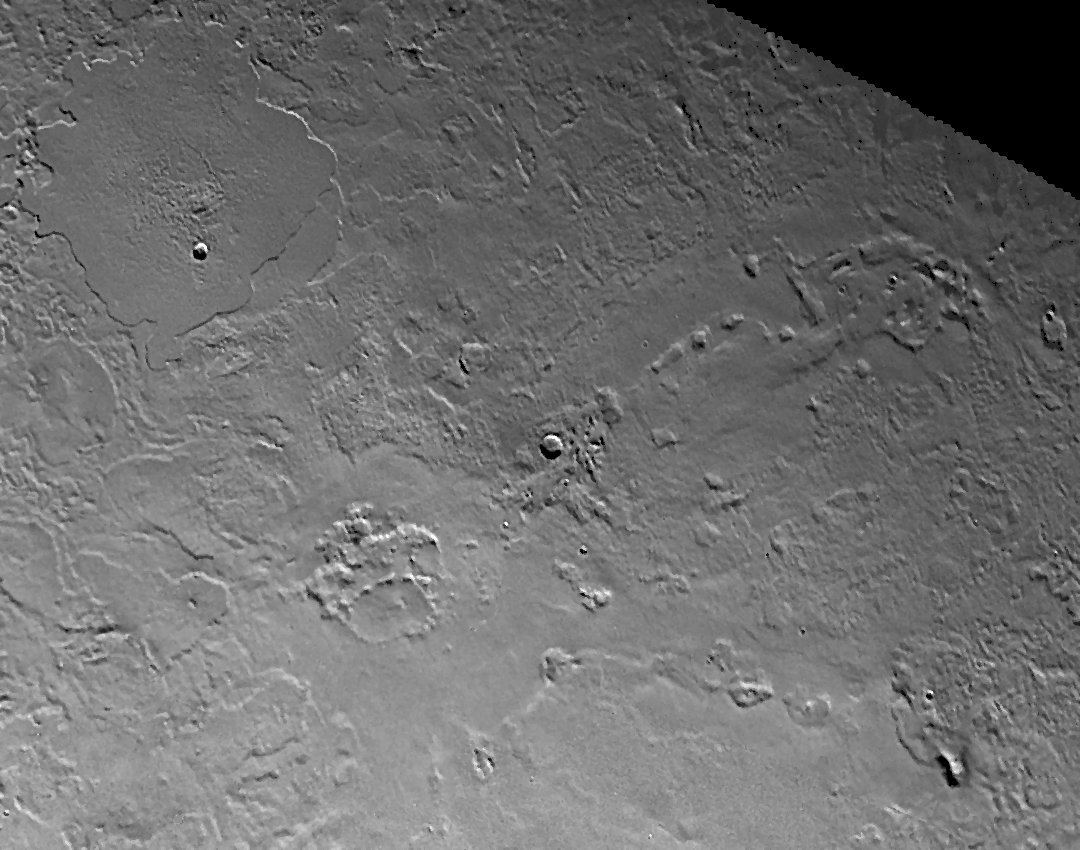
- Mosaic of Voyager 2 images of Leviathan Patera slightly lower left of center, nearby Ruach Planitia at upper right, and the surrounding Cipango Planum region
- Feature type: Cryovolcanic caldera, cryovolcano
- Location: Monad Regio, Triton
- Coordinates: 17°00′N 28°30′E
- Diameter: ~80 km
- Peak: ~1 km
- Discoverer: Voyager 2
- Eponym: Leviathan

Leviathan Patera is a major cryovolcanic caldera on Neptune's largest moon Triton. Discovered by the Voyager 2 spacecraft in 1989, Leviathan Patera is located in Monad Regio and within Cipango Planum's western regions. Leviathan Patera is approximately 80 kilometres (50 miles) in diameter and may be the center of one of the largest cryovolcanic or volcanic edifices in the Solar System.

== Discovery and naming ==
Leviathan Patera, first viewed by the Voyager 2 spacecraft on its flyby of the Neptune system on 25 August 1989, is named after the biblical Hebrew sea serpent, the Leviathan. The name was officially approved by the International Astronomical Union (IAU) in 1991.

== Geology ==
Leviathan Patera is a large, steep-sided depression with a number of arcuate scarps; its general structure strongly resembles that of terrestrial collapse calderas on Earth. The northern half of Leviathan Patera's floor is ~450 metres (1,480 ft) deep and largely flat, though an irregular plateau interrupts the flat floor. In contrast, the southern half of Leviathan Patera is occupied by a broad dome ~400 metres (1,300 ft) high, nearly level with the surrounding plains. The northwestern section of Leviathan Patera is host to a high point approximately 1 kilometre (0.62 mi) in height, one of the highest points in the local region. Leviathan Patera is surrounded by a ring of very smooth terrain that is etched by arcuate alcoves that all face outward from the caldera center. Leviathan Patera sits near two major tectonic features, Kraken Catena and Set Catena, likely indicating that Leviathan Patera's formation and activity is closely linked to rifting at its site.

Leviathan Patera appears to be the central vent of a massive, geologically young plateau of cryovolcanic material, Cipango Planum. Eruptions of volatile material termed cryolava from Leviathan Patera constructed much of Cipango Planum's edifice and the smooth terrain immediately surrounding Leviathan Patera. Assuming Cipango Planum is a part of Leviathan Patera's cryovolcanic edifice, Leviathan Patera is the largest known cryovolcano on Triton and one of the largest volcanic features in the Solar System. (Note: Using an area of at least 490,000 km^{2} for Cipango Planum, this significantly surpasses Olympus Mons's area of roughly 300,000 km^{2}. As Cipango Planum extended beyond Triton's terminator during Voyager 2's closest approach, its true extent is uncertain and may be significantly larger.) The eruptive history of Leviathan Patera may have occurred in several stages, first erupting low-viscosity cryolava which resurfaced the surrounding plains (possibly accounting for Cipango Planum's very shallow relief), eventually transitioning to explosive eruptions before finally transitioning to erupting higher-viscosity material constructing domes within the caldera. Comparatively little collapse appears to have occurred within the center of Leviathan Patera, and apparent explosion pits surround a ring fracture.

== See also ==
- Geology of Triton – Geologic structure and composition of Triton
- Doom Mons – Mountain on Titan
- Wright Mons – Mountain on Pluto
