= Comet Hopper =

Proposed NASA mission concept to explore Comet 46P/Wirtanen

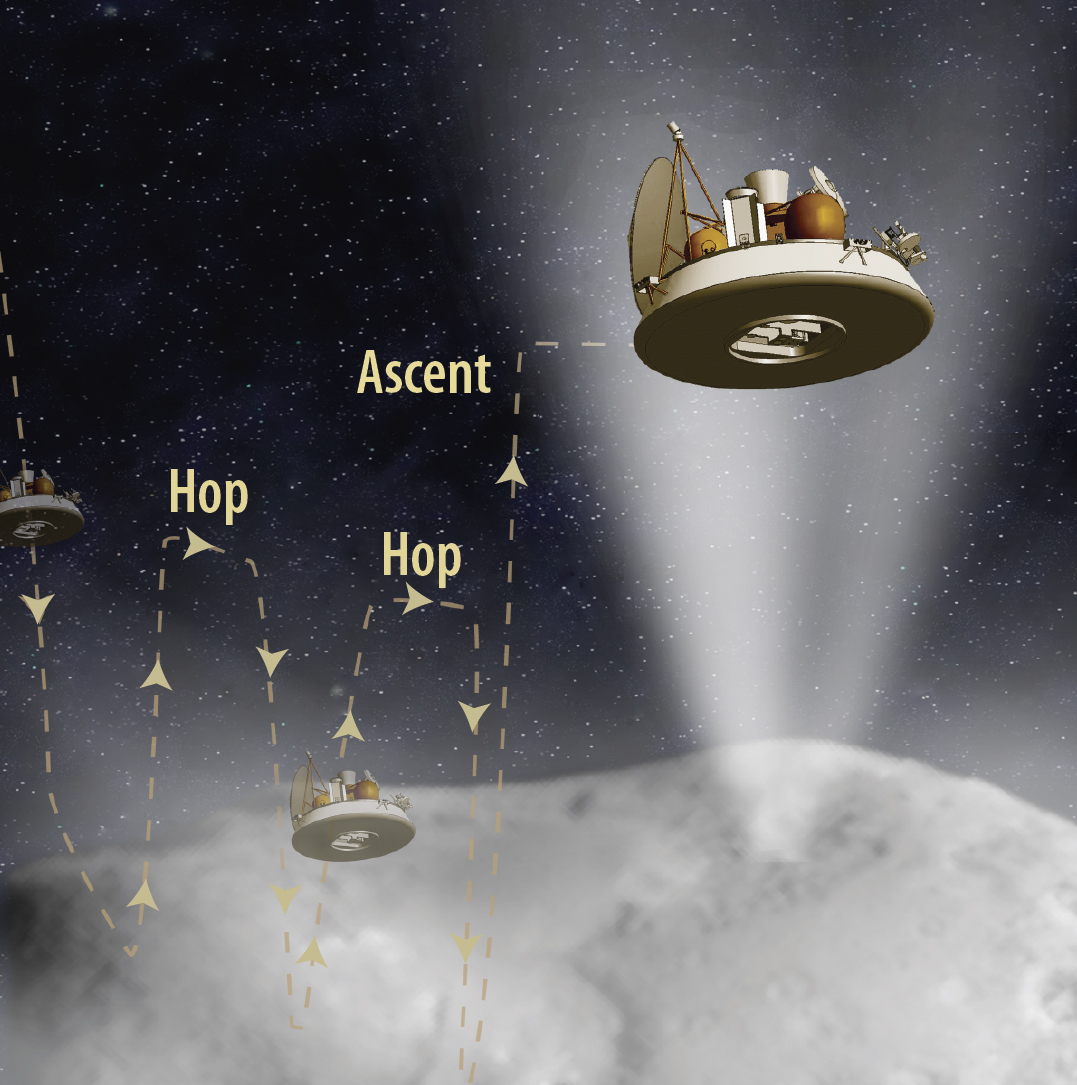
- Concept art of Comet Hopper
- Names: CHopper
- Mission type: Comet exploration
- Operator: NASA
- Mission duration: Proposed (Cancelled): 7.3 years

Spacecraft properties
- Manufacturer: UMD; Lockheed Martin; Goddard

Start of mission
- Launch date: 2016
- Rocket: Atlas V
- Launch site: Cape Canaveral, LC-41
- Contractor: ULA

46P/Wirtanen lander
- Landing date: 2022
Instruments
- CHIRS: CHopper Infrared Spectrometer
- CHIMS: CHopper Ion/Neutral Mass Spectrometer
- CHI: CHopper Imager
- CHEX: CHopper Heating Experiment
- PanCams: Panoramic Cameras

Comet Hopper (CHopper) was a proposed lander to NASA's Discovery Program that, had it been selected, would have orbited and landed multiple times on Comet Wirtanen as it approached the Sun. The proposed mission was led by Jessica Sunshine of the UMD, working with Lockheed Martin to build the spacecraft and the NASA Goddard Spaceflight Center to manage the mission.

== History ==
The Comet Hopper mission was one of three Discovery Program finalists that received US$3 million in May 2011 to develop a detailed concept study.

The other two missions were InSight and Titan Mare Explorer. After a review in August 2012, NASA selected the InSight mission.

== Scientific goals ==
The CHopper mission had three primary science goals for the 7.3 years of its lifetime. At roughly 4.5 AU the spacecraft would have rendezvoused with Comet Wirtanen to map the spatial heterogeneity of surface solids as well as gas and dust emissions from the coma - the nebulous envelope around the nucleus of a comet. The remote mapping would also allow for any nucleus structure, geologic processes, and coma mechanisms to be determined. After arriving at Comet Wirtanen, the spacecraft would have approached and landed, then subsequently hopped to other locations on the comet. As the comet approached the sun, the spacecraft would land and hop multiple times to record surface changes as the comet became more active. The final landing would occur at 1.5 AU.

== See also ==
- Champollion (spacecraft)
- Mars Geyser Hopper
- Rosetta (spacecraft)
- Triton Hopper
