= Set Catena =

Crater chain on Triton

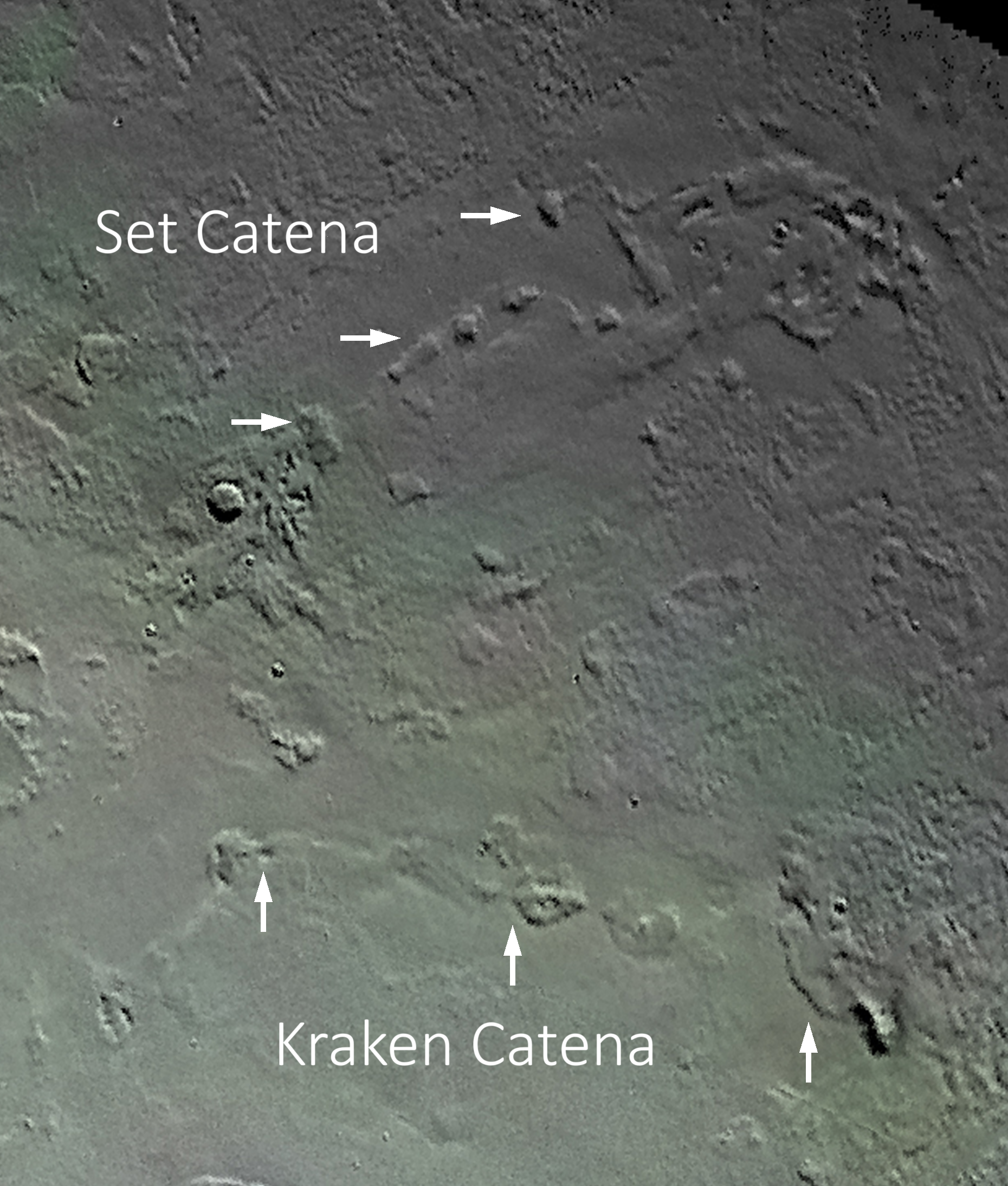
- Set Catena and Kraken Catena, highlighted with arrows. The two pit chains are aligned radially from nearby Leviathan Patera.
- Feature type: Crater chain, tectonic rift
- Location: Monad Regio, Triton
- Coordinates: 22.00°N 33.50°E
- Depth: ~500 m
- Discoverer: Voyager 2
- Eponym: Set

Set Catena is a pit chain (catena) and likely tectonic fault located on Triton, the largest natural satellite of Neptune. It, along with Kraken Catena, is located near Leviathan Patera, a major cryovolcanic feature; as such, Set Catena may have played a role in rift-induced cryovolcanic activity in Leviathan Patera. Set Catena extends radially northwards from Leviathan Patera, terminating at another irregularly shaped walled depression.

Set Catena consists of semi-regularly spaced pits roughly 20 km (12 mi) separated from each other, with each pit being on average 10 km (6.2 mi) and up to 500 m (1,600 ft) deep. The pits may have formed from collapse or from explosive cryovolcanic eruptions, and may have been subsequently expanded by mass wasting processes. Set Catena may be a northeastern extension of Raz Fossae, a similar fault system southwest of Leviathan Patera.

As with all other surface features of Triton, Set Catena was discovered when Voyager 2 visited the Neptune system on 25 August 1989. It is named after the deity Set from Egyptian mythology, with the name being officially approved by the International Astronomical Union (IAU) in 1991. It is located at approximately 22°N, 33°30E, within Cipango Planum and Monad Regio.

== See also ==
- List of geological features on Triton
- Geology of Triton
