= Europa Lander =

Cancelled NASA lander for Europa

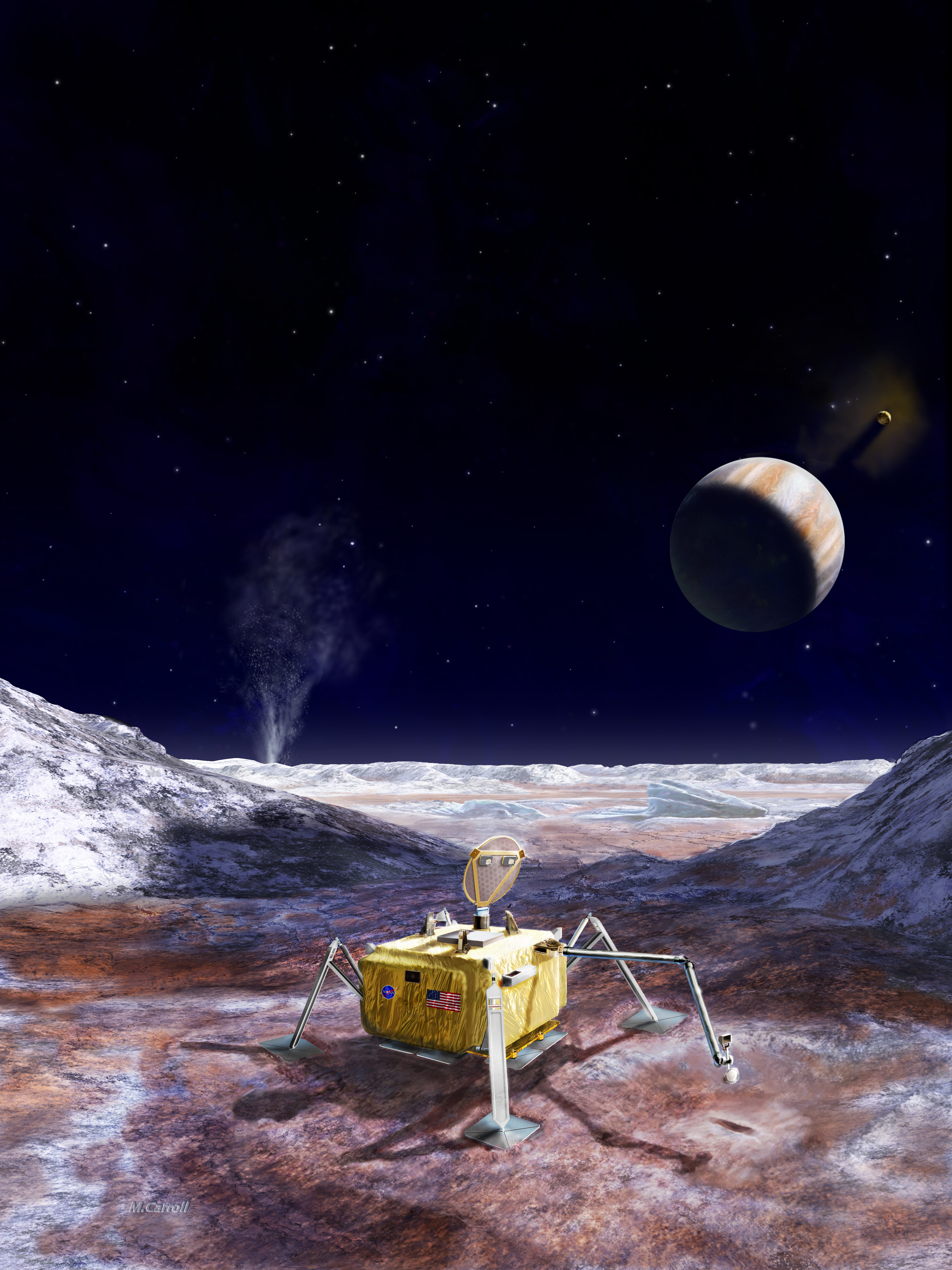
- Artist's concept of the Europa Lander with Jupiter and Io in the background
- Mission type: Astrobiology
- Operator: NASA
- Website: jpl.nasa.gov
- Mission duration: ≤ 22 days on the surface

Spacecraft properties
- Launch mass: 16.6 metric tons
- Power: 50 kWh (from batteries only)

Start of mission
- Launch date: 2025–2030 (cancelled)
- Rocket: Space Launch System or a commercial rocket

Flyby of Earth
- Closest approach: 2027–2032

Jupiter orbiter
- Orbital insertion: 2030–2035

Europa lander
- Landing date: 2032–2037
- Large Strategic Science Missions; Planetary Science Division

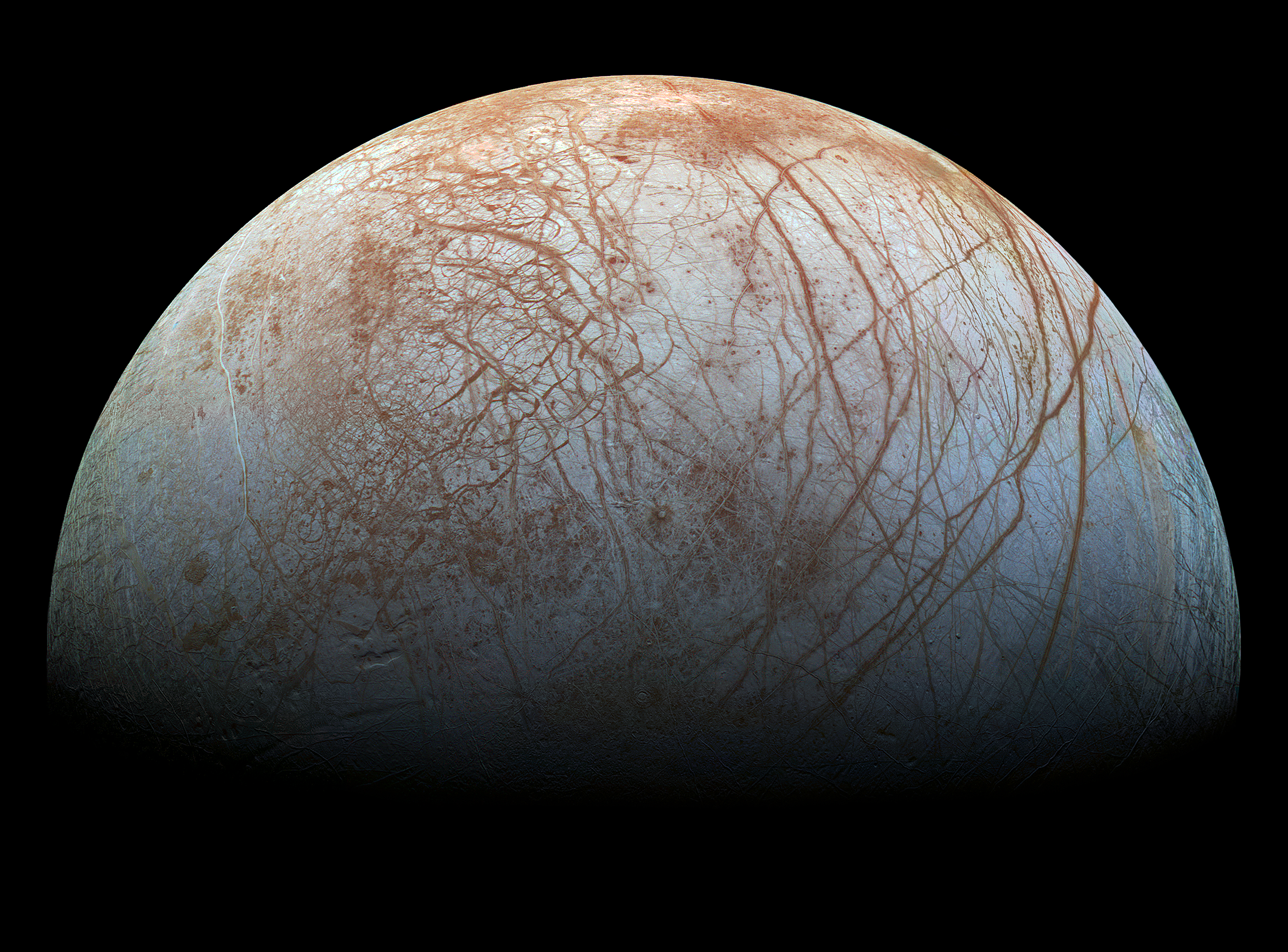
Europa

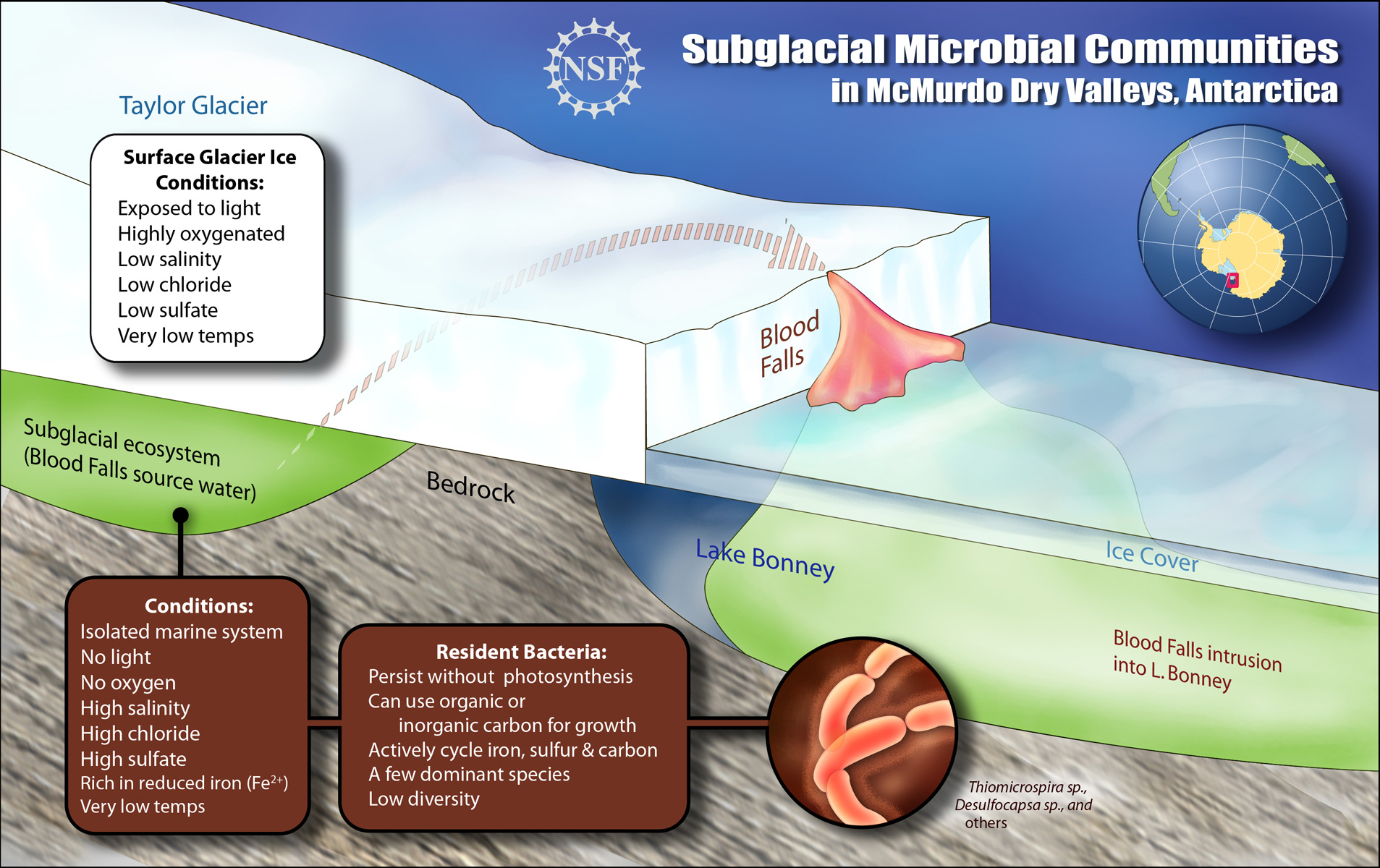
On Earth, subglacial microbial communities at Blood Falls survive in cold darkness without oxygen, living in brine water below Taylor Glacier, but come out at this location in Antarctica. The red color comes from dissolved iron.

The Europa Lander was a proposed astrobiology mission concept by NASA to send a lander to Europa, an icy moon of Jupiter. If it was funded and developed as a large strategic science mission, it would have been launched in 2027 to complement the studies by the Europa Clipper orbiter mission and perform analyses on site.

The objectives of the mission were to search for biosignatures at the subsurface ≈10 cm, to characterize the composition of non-ice near-subsurface material, and determine the proximity of liquid water and recently erupted material near the lander's location.

== History ==
NASA had previously evaluated a Europa Lander concept in 2005 with the Europa Lander Mission concept. Also, a lander was evaluated in 2012. There was continued support for Europa missions, including in 2014, when the U.S. Congress House Appropriations Committee announced a bipartisan bill that included US$80 million in funding to continue the Europa mission concept studies.

The United States Congress issued a congressional directive on a Europa Lander, and NASA initiated a study in 2016, assessing and evaluating the concept. The mission concept is being supported by the Ocean Worlds Exploration Program. NASA's Planetary Science Division delivered its report in early February 2017. This was a six-month-long study by a Science Definition Team. The study assesses the science value and engineering design of a potential Europa lander mission.

NASA's 2021 fiscal year budget in Congress's Omnibus Spending Bill did not include any language mandating or funding the Europa Lander as previous bills, made the mission's future uncertain.

The Europa Lander was considered by the Planetary Science Decadal Report of 2023─2032 but rejected in favor of the Uranus Orbiter and Probe and Enceladus Orbilander. Eventually, the plans for such a lander were shelved in 2025.

== Overview ==
The primary mission goal was to detect of organic indicators of past or present life, called biosignatures. The lander was described as a logical follow-up to the Galileo orbiter and probe mission in the 1990s, for which a major result was the discovery of a large sub-surface ocean that may offer habitable aquatic conditions.

On Earth, life can be found in essentially all locations where water is present. It follows that Europa is an excellent candidate in the search for life elsewhere in the Solar System. This subsurface water may not only be warmed by geological activity, but likely also enriched with dissolved minerals and organic compounds.

Various ecosystems exist on Earth without any access to sunlight relying instead on hydrothermal vents or other sources of chemicals suitable to energy production by extremophiles (see chemosynthesis). Measurements to date indicate that Europa has an ocean approximately twice the volume of Earth's oceans. This water layer below the ice may be in contact with the moon's interior allowing ready access to hydrothermal energy and chemistry. A surface mission can take advantage of the relatively young, active surface of Europa as this activity may allow deep subsurface materials to regularly relocate to the surface.

=== Status ===
In 18 July 2017, the House Space Subcommittee held hearings on the Europa Clipper as a scheduled large strategic science mission and to discuss this lander as a possible follow up. The president's 2018 and 2019 federal budget proposals do not fund the Europa Lander, but they did assign US$195 million for concept studies and research on the required science instruments. The 2022 omnibus spending bill allocates $14.2 million to Icy Satellites Surface Technology for a future Ocean Worlds lander mission (NASA had requested $5 million for the Europa Lander). Eventually, the plans for such a lander was shelved in 2025.

== Objectives ==
The lander mission would have three main science objectives:

- Search for biosignatures.
- Assess the habitability of Europa via in situ techniques uniquely available to a landed mission.
- Characterize the surface and subsurface properties at the scale of the lander to support future exploration of Europa.

== Spacecraft ==
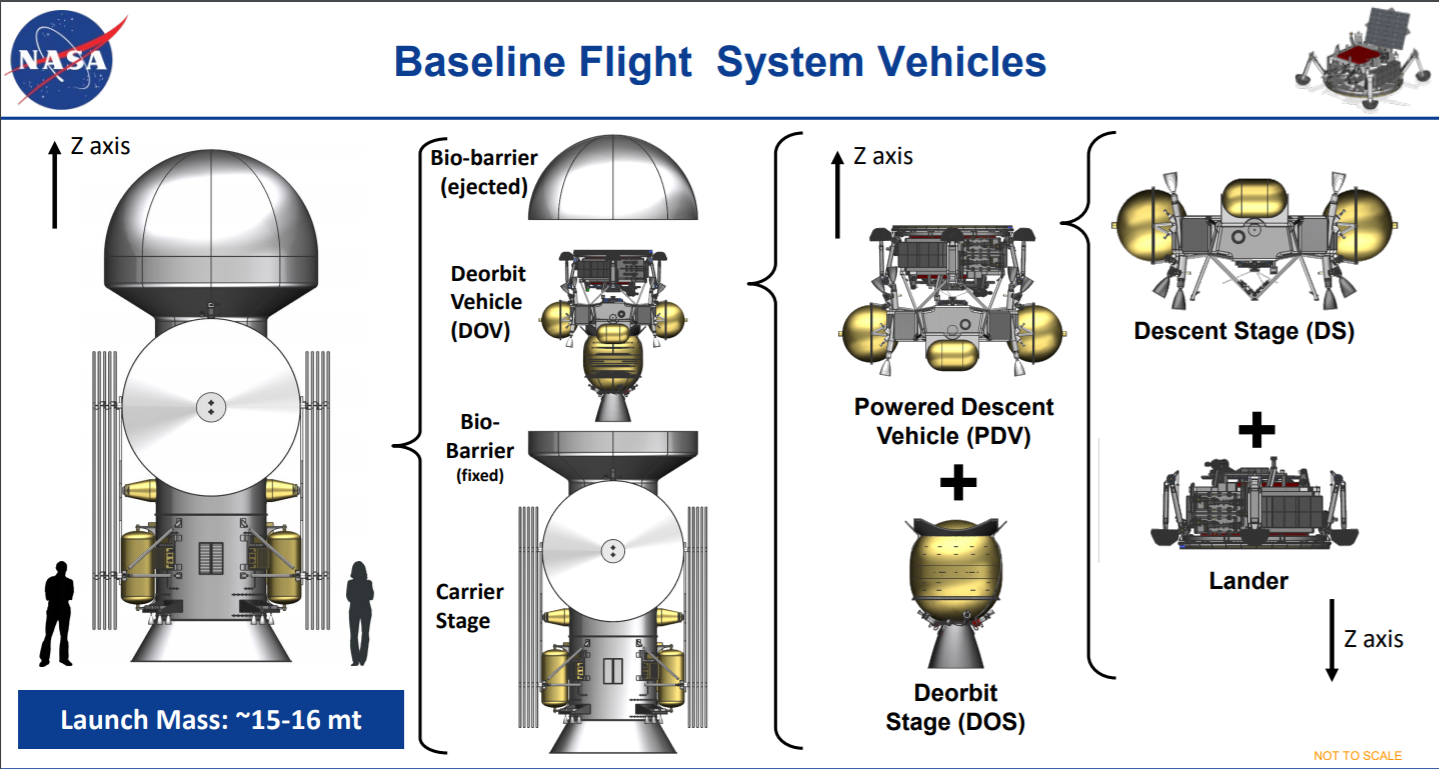
2019 concept by JPL of the Europa Lander modules

The key phases of the flight would have been: launch, cruise, de-orbit, descent and landing. The spacecraft consists of several modules that would be discarded at different phases of its deorbiting and landing sequence. The complete stack would be propelled by the Carrier Stage, that also features the solar panels. After orbit injection around Jupiter, the spacecraft would spend about two years adjusting its orbit and velocity before attempting to land on Europa.

In preparation to its landing, the Carrier Stage would be discarded, leaving the spacecraft stack in a configuration called Deorbit Vehicle (DOV) that would decelerate and initiate the descent. The engine module for this phase, called Deorbit Stage (DOS) would be discarded after the burn, leaving what is called the Powered Descent Vehicle (PDV) – which comprises the lander and the sky crane system. The sky crane system would lower the lander with a tether to a soft landing with a 100 m (330 ft) accuracy.

The lander would feature a robotic arm with 5 degrees of freedom, that would enable it to dig out several shallow sub-surface samples at a maximum depth of 10 cm (3.9 in) and deliver them to its onboard laboratory.

=== Power ===
Once landed, the lander would operate for up to 22 days by using chemical battery power, rather than a radioisotope thermoelectric generator (RTG) or solar power. The 2019 concept proposes four batteries, which would provide three times the needed energy for safety margin during its ≈22-day surface operations. The baseline is 7 days to complete its surface mission, the additional 15 days are for contingencies.

Regardless of the power source, one of the limiting factors for the lifetime of the mission would be enduring intense radiation; the surface of Europa is estimated to experience 540 rem per day, whereas a typical Earth surface dose is about 0.14 rem/year. It is estimated that the probe would receive a total ionizing dose of 2.3 Mrad over the 30 day mission. Radiation damaged the electronics of the Galileo orbiter during its mission.

== Launch and trajectory ==
The launcher would have been the Space Launch System (SLS), with a suggested launch between 2025-2030. The SLS is proposed given the spacecraft's mass of 16.6 metric tons, including the solid propellant to place the spacecraft into orbit around Jupiter, and the sky crane landing system. One calculated trajectory would see a launch aboard SLS in 2025, Earth gravity assist in 2027, and Jupiter/Europa arrival in 2030. It would spend some time orbiting around Jupiter over the next year to maneuver for its landing on Europa. The landing would be performed two years after orbit insertion around Jupiter.

== Landing sites ==
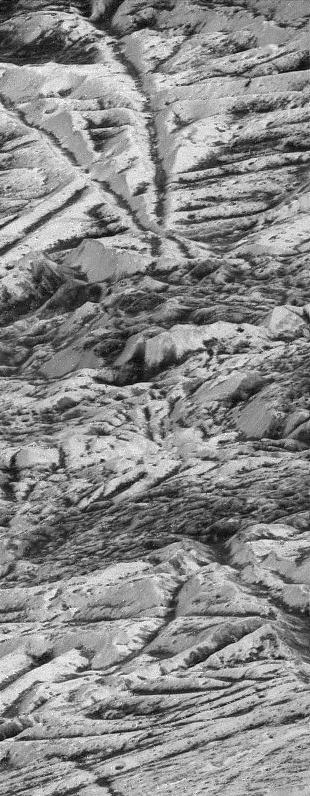
View of Europa's surface from 560 km (335 miles) altitude, as seen during the closest Galileo flyby

At Europa, it would have to land on the surface, matching its velocity, but with essentially no atmosphere there is no "entry", it is just a descent and landing. The Planetary Society noted that NASA called this DDL — de-orbit, descent, and landing. In 1995, astronomers using the Hubble Space Telescope discovered that Europa has a very tenuous exosphere composed of oxygen. Compared to Earth, its atmosphere is thin to the extreme, with pressure at the surface predicted to be 0.1 μPa, or 10^{−12} times that of the Earth.

The lander would communicate directly to Earth, but the Europa Clipper, if still operational, could function as an additional communications relay for the lander. To ensure communication, there is a suggestion to include a telecomm orbiter with the lander mission.

Surface texture

A study published in October 2018 suggests that most of Europa's surface may be covered with closely spaced ice spikes, called penitents, as tall as 15 meters (50 ft). Although the imaging available from the Galileo orbiter does not have the resolution needed to confirm this, radar and thermal data are consistent with this interpretation. This supports the need to first perform high-definition reconnaissance with the ESA's Jupiter Icy Moons Explorer (JUICE) and Europa Clipper, launching in 2023 and 2024 respectively, before planning a lander mission.

== Science payload ==
The mission concept would require funding and further development to be launched. One of the key requirements is to operate in the radiation environment at the moon's surface. The radiation environment at Europa is extreme, so the lander may need as much additional protection as the Juno Radiation Vault in the Juno Jupiter orbiter. The vault helped reduce radiation exposure to vulnerable systems, especially electronics on the orbiter.

NASA announced in May 2017 to the scientific community to think on possible Europa Lander instruments. The concept study reports were made available in June 2019.

NASA selected 14 potential instruments for maturation under Instrument Concepts for Europa Exploration 2 (ICEE-2) awarding approximately US$2 million each for two years. The ICEE-2 project would allow the maturation of novel instrument approaches to meet the science goals and objectives of the mission.

ICEE-2 awardees
Instrument	Principal investigator
C-LIFE: Cold-Lightweight Imagers for Europa	Shane Bryne, University of Arizona
ELSSIE: Europa Lander Stereo Spectral Imaging Experiment	Scott L. Murchie, Johns Hopkins University Applied Physics Laboratory
CORALS: Characterization of Ocean Residues and Life Signatures	Ricardo D. Arevalo, University of Maryland
MASPEX-ORCA: MAss Spectrometer for Planetary EXploration–ORganic Composition Analyzer	Christopher R. Glein, Southwest Research Institute
MOAB: Microfluidic Organic Analyzer for Biosignatures	Richard A. Mathies, University of California Berkeley
EMILI: Europan Molecular Indicators of Life Investigation	W. B. Brinckerhoff, Goddard Space Flight Center
CIRS: Compact Integrated Raman Spectrometer	James L. Lambert, Jet Propulsion Laboratory
ELM: Europa Luminescence Microscope	Richard Quinn, Ames Research Center
SIIOS: Seismometer to Investigate Ice and Ocean Structure	Samuel H. Bailey, University of Arizona
ESP: Europa Seismic Package	Mark P. Panning, Jet Propulsion Laboratory
MICA: Microfluidic Icy-World Chemistry Analyzer	Antonio J. Ricco, Ames Research Center
MAGNET: Radiation Tolerant Magnetometer	Mark B. Moldwin, University of Michigan, Ann Arbor
EMS: Europa Magnetotelluric Sounder	Robert E. Grimm, Southwest Research Institute
CADMES: Collaborative Acceptance and Distribution for Measuring Europan Samples System	Charles A. Malespin, Goddard Space Flight Center

== Planetary protection ==
Planetary protection guidelines require that inadvertent contamination of a Europan ocean by terrestrial organisms must be avoided, to a probability level of less than 1 in 10,000. The lander, and landing system components, must be assembled and tested in a clean room where all parts would have to be cleaned or sterilized before they are installed in the spacecraft. After delivering the lander, the sky crane is recommended to fly away into Jupiter for disposal. At the end of the mission, the lander might self-destruct using an incendiary device. That system can also be triggered if the spacecraft loses contact with the Earth.

== Europa Clipper ==
The Europa Clipper is a separately launched spacecraft that would lay a foundation for the Europa Lander mission. Previously, NASA had evaluated launching the orbiter and lander together, but the strong congressional support led to an additional proposal in 2016 for a separate lander mission. The Clipper orbiter will provide reconnaissance data to characterize the radiation environment and help determine a landing location.

== See also ==
- Europa Orbiter – Cancelled NASA orbiter mission to Europa
- Galilean moons – Four largest moons of Jupiter
- Juno (spacecraft) – Second NASA orbiter mission to Jupiter (2011–Present)
- Laplace-P – Proposed Russian spacecraft to study the Jovian moon system and land on Ganymede
- Ocean Worlds Exploration Program – NASA program for the exploration of water worlds in the Solar System
