= Triton (moon) =

Largest moon of Neptune

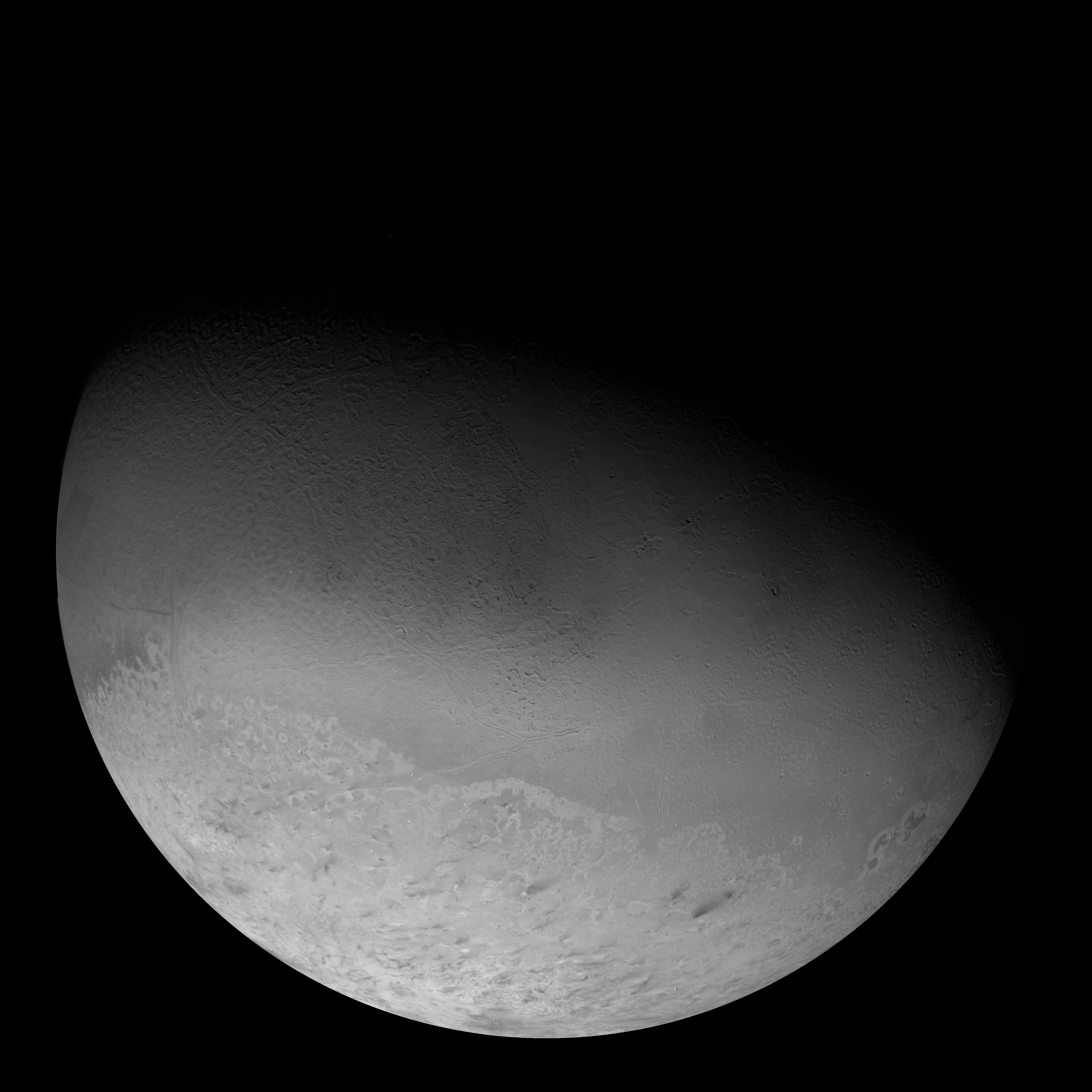
- A black-and-white mosaic of Triton, constructed from Voyager 2 imagery. Triton's massive south polar cap dominates most of the image, with cryovolcanic features such as Leviathan Patera located left of center.

Discovery
- Discovered by: William Lassell
- Discovery date: October 10, 1846

Designations
- Designation: Neptune I
- Pronunciation: /ˈtraɪtən/ (TRY-tən)
- Named after: Τρίτων Trītōn
- Adjectives: Tritonian (/traɪˈtoʊniən/)

Orbital characteristics
- Semi-major axis: 354,759 km
- Eccentricity: 0.00001
- Orbital period (sidereal): 5.87685407 d (retrograde)
- Average orbital speed: 4.39 km/s (Note: Calculated on the basis of other parameters.)
- Mean motion: 61.2572638°/d
- Inclination: 156.8650° (to the Laplace plane); 129.812° (to the ecliptic); 156.885° (to Neptune's equator); 129.608° (to Neptune's orbit)
- Satellite of: Neptune

Physical characteristics
- Dimensions: (2709.2 × 2705.6 × 2704.8) ± 1.8 km
- Mean radius: 1,353.4±0.9 km (0.2122 R_{🜨})
- Surface area: 23,018,000 km^{2} (Note: Surface area derived from the radius r: $4 \pi r^2$.)
- Volume: 10,384,000,000 km^{3} (Note: Volume v derived from the radius r: $\frac{4}{3}\pi r^3$.)
- Mass: (2.1389±0.0028)×10^{22} kg (0.00358 Earths)
- Mean density: 2.061 g/cm^{3}
- Surface gravity: 0.779 m/s^{2} (0.0794 g) (0.48 Moons) (Note: Surface gravity derived from the mass m, the gravitational constant G and the radius r: $\frac{Gm}{r^2}$.)
- Escape velocity: 1.455 km/s (Note: Escape velocity derived from the mass m, the gravitational constant G and the radius r: $\sqrt{2Gm/r}$.)
- Synodic rotation period: synchronous
- Sidereal rotation period: 5 d, 21 h, 2 min, 53 s
- Axial tilt: 0° (Note: With respect to Triton's orbit about Neptune.)
- Albedo: 0.72/0.76 (geometric); 0.67–0.86 (bolometric Bond)
- Temperature: 37.9–46.1 K (−235.2 – −227.1 °C)
- Apparent magnitude: 13.47
- Absolute magnitude (H): −1.2

Atmosphere
- Surface pressure: 1.4 Pa (1.38×10^{−5} atm) (1989); 1.9 Pa (1.88×10^{−5} atm) (1997); 1.454 Pa (1.43×10^{−5} atm) (2022)
- Composition by volume: nitrogen; methane and carbon monoxide traces

Triton is the largest natural satellite of the planet Neptune. It is the only moon of Neptune massive enough to be rounded under its own gravity and hosts a thin, hazy atmosphere. Triton orbits Neptune in a retrograde orbit—revolving in the opposite direction to the parent planet's rotation—the only large moon in the Solar System to do so. Triton is thought to have once been a dwarf planet from the Kuiper belt, captured into Neptune's orbit by the latter's gravity.

At 2,706.8 kilometers (1,681.9 mi) in diameter, Triton is the seventh-largest moon in the Solar System, the second-largest planetary moon in relation to its primary (after Earth's Moon), and larger than all of the known dwarf planets. The mean density is 2.061 g/cm^{3}, reflecting a composition of approximately 30–45% water ice by mass, with the rest being mostly rock and metal. Triton is differentiated, with a crust of primarily ice atop a probable subsurface ocean of liquid water and a solid rocky-metallic core at its center. Although Triton's orbit is nearly circular with a very low orbital eccentricity of 0.00001, its interior may still experience tidal heating through obliquity tides.

Triton is one of the most geologically active worlds in the Solar System, with an estimated average surface age of less than 100 million years old. Its surface is covered by frozen nitrogen and is geologically young, with very few impact craters. Young, intricate cryovolcanic and tectonic terrains suggest a complex geological history. The atmosphere of Triton is composed primarily of nitrogen, with minor components of methane and carbon monoxide. Triton's atmosphere is relatively thin and strongly variable, with its atmospheric surface pressure varying by up to a factor of three within the past 30 years. Triton's atmosphere supports clouds of nitrogen ice crystals and a layer of organic atmospheric haze.

Triton was the first Neptunian moon to be discovered, on October 10, 1846, by English astronomer William Lassell. The 1989 flyby of Triton by the Voyager 2 spacecraft remains the only up-close visit to the moon as of 2026. As the probe was able to study only about 40% of the moon's surface, multiple concept missions have been developed to revisit Triton. These include a Discovery-class Trident and New Frontiers-class Triton Ocean Worlds Surveyor and Nautilus.

== Discovery and naming ==
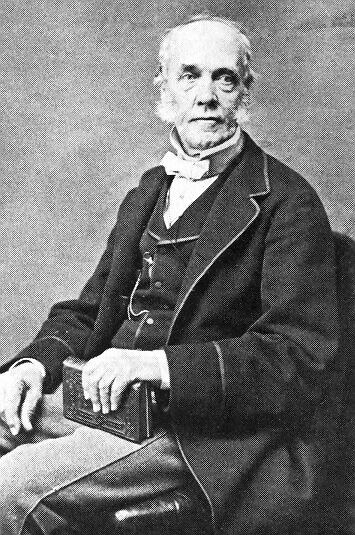
William Lassell, the discoverer of Triton

Triton was discovered by British astronomer William Lassell on October 10, 1846, just 17 days after the discovery of Neptune. When John Herschel received news of Neptune's discovery, he wrote to Lassell suggesting he search for possible moons. Lassell discovered Triton eight days later. Lassell also claimed for a period (Note: Lassell rejected his previous claim of discovery when he found that the orientation of the supposed rings changed when he rotated his telescope tube; see p. 9 of Smith & Baum, 1984.) to have discovered rings. Although Neptune was later confirmed to have rings, they are so faint and dark that it is not plausible he saw them. A brewer by trade, Lassell spotted Triton with his self-built 61-centimetre-aperture (24 in) metal mirror reflecting telescope (also known as the "two-foot" reflector). This telescope was donated to the Royal Observatory, Greenwich in the 1880s, but was eventually dismantled.

Triton is named after the Greek sea god Triton (Τρίτων), the son of Poseidon (the Greek god corresponding to the Roman Neptune). The name was first proposed by Camille Flammarion in his 1880 book Astronomie Populaire, and was officially adopted many decades later. Until the discovery of the second moon Nereid in 1949, Triton was commonly referred to as "the satellite of Neptune". Lassell did not name his discovery; he later successfully suggested the name Hyperion for the eighth moon of Saturn when he discovered it.

Planetary moons other than Earth's were never given symbols in the astronomical literature. Denis Moskowitz, a software engineer who designed most of the dwarf planet symbols, proposed a Greek tau (the initial of Triton) combined with Neptune's trident as the symbol of Triton. This symbol is not widely used.

== Orbit and rotation ==
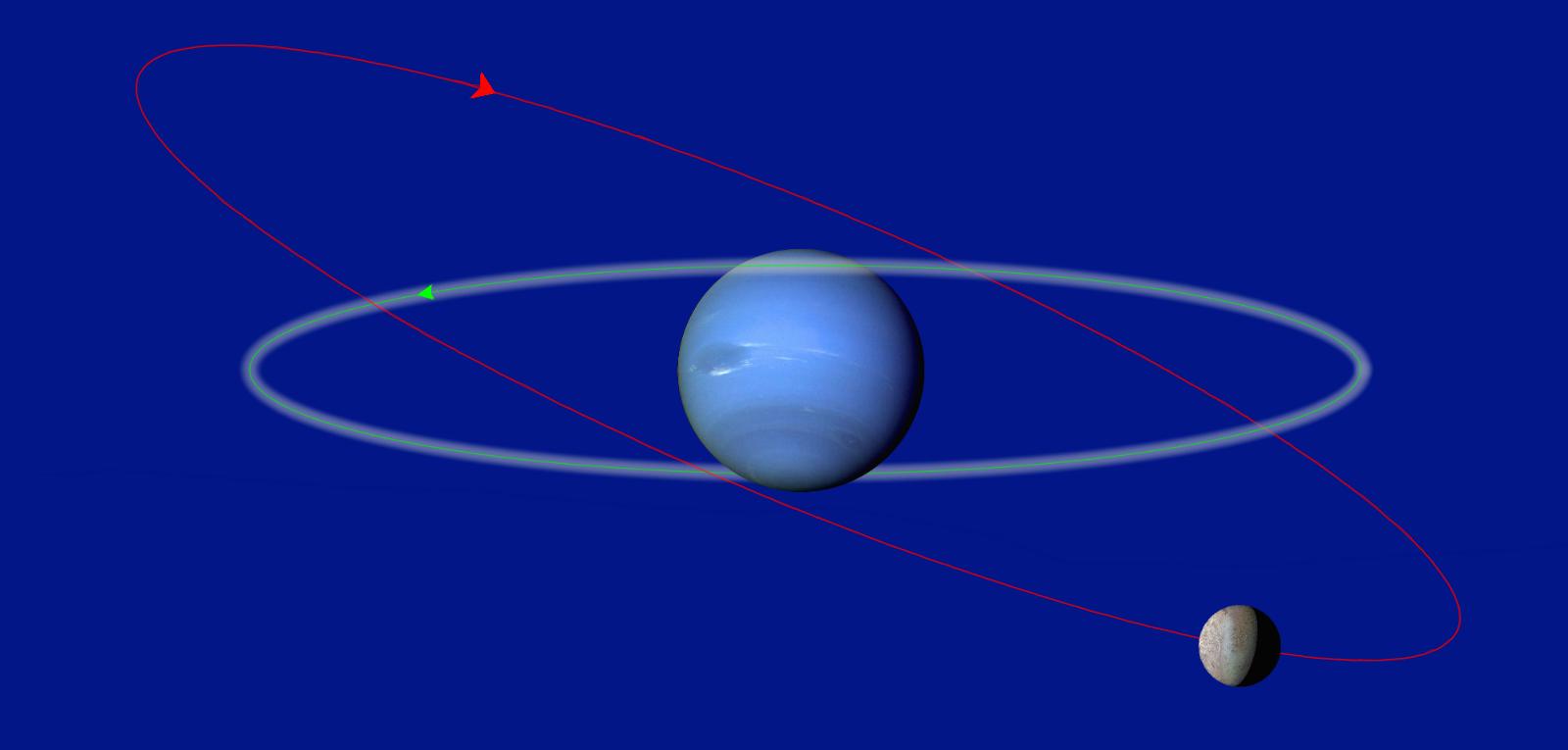
The orbit of Triton (red) is opposite in direction and tilted −23° compared to a typical moon's orbit (green) in the plane of Neptune's equator.

Triton is unique among all large moons in the Solar System for its retrograde orbit around its planet (i.e. it orbits in a direction opposite to the planet's rotation). Most of the outer irregular moons of Jupiter and Saturn also have retrograde orbits, as do some of the irregular moons of Uranus and Neptune. However, these moons are all much more distant from their primaries and are small in comparison, with the largest of them (Phoebe) (Note: Largest irregular moons: Saturn's Phoebe (210 km), Uranus's Sycorax (160 km), and Jupiter's Himalia (140 km)) having only 8% of the diameter (and 0.03% of the mass) of Triton, making Triton by far the largest moon with a retrograde orbit.

Triton's orbit is associated with two tilts, the obliquity of Neptune's rotation to Neptune's orbit, 30°, and the inclination of Triton's orbit to Neptune's rotation, 157° (an inclination over 90° indicates retrograde motion). Triton's orbit precesses forward relative to Neptune's rotation with a period of about 678 Earth years (4.1 Neptunian years), making its Neptune-orbit-relative inclination vary between 127° and 173°. That inclination is currently 130°; Triton's orbit is now near its maximum departure from coplanarity with Neptune's.

Astronomers usually classify it as an irregular satellite, due to its ex situ origin and retrograde orbit. However, like a regular satellite, its orbit is relatively close in and its precession is primarily controlled by Neptune rather than the Sun, conflicting with the usual definition of irregular satellites. As a result, Triton is often put in its own category.

Triton's rotation is tidally locked to be synchronous with its orbit around Neptune: it keeps one face oriented towards the planet at all times. Its equator is almost exactly aligned with its orbital plane. At present, Triton's rotational axis is about 40° from Neptune's orbital plane, hence as Neptune orbits the Sun, Triton's polar regions take turns facing the Sun, resulting in seasonal changes as one pole, then the other moves into the sunlight. Such changes were observed in 2010.

Triton's revolution around Neptune has become a nearly perfect circle with an eccentricity of almost zero. Viscoelastic damping from tides alone is not thought to be capable of circularizing Triton's orbit in the time since the origin of the system, and gas drag from a prograde debris disc is likely to have played a substantial role. Tidal interactions also cause Triton's orbit, which is already closer to Neptune than the Moon is to Earth, to gradually decay further; predictions originally said that 3.6 billion years from now, Triton will pass within Neptune's Roche limit. This will result in either a collision with Neptune's atmosphere or the breakup of Triton, forming a new ring system similar to that found around Saturn. However, a newer study done in 2025 has analyzed that Triton will reach Neptune's Roche limit in 28 billion years. This indicates a more stable orbital evolution of Triton over a long period of time.

== Capture ==
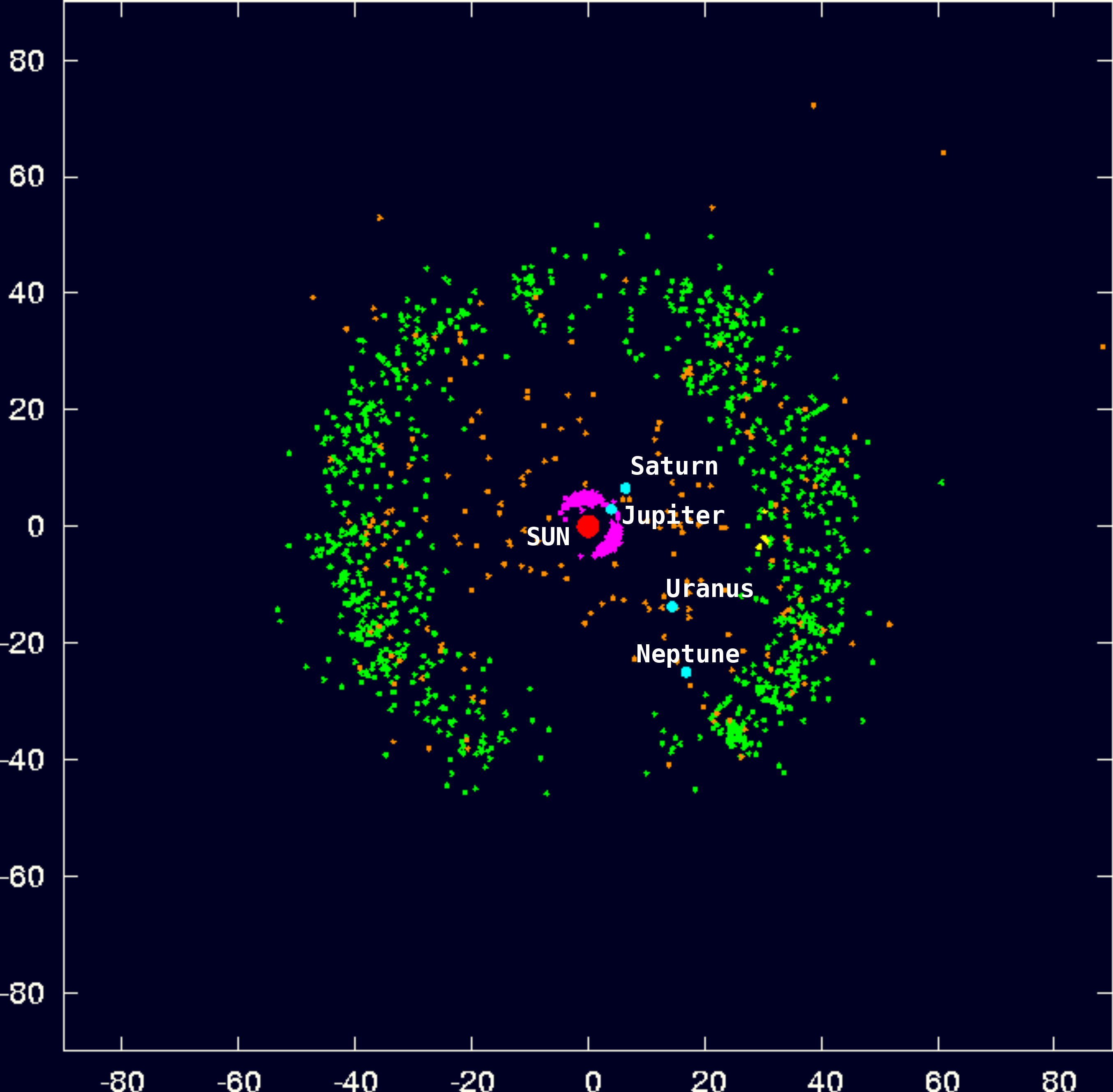
The Kuiper belt (green), in the Solar System's outskirts, is where Triton is thought to have originated.

The current understanding of moons in retrograde orbits means they cannot form in the same region of the solar nebula as the planets they orbit. Therefore, Triton must have been captured from elsewhere in the Solar System. Astrophysicists believe it might have originated in the Kuiper belt, a ring of small icy objects extending from just inside the orbit of Neptune to about 50 AU from the Sun. Thought to be the point of origin for the majority of short-period comets observed from Earth, the belt is also home to several large dwarf planets including Pluto, which is now recognized as the largest in a population of Kuiper belt objects (the plutinos) locked in resonant orbits with Neptune. Triton is only slightly larger than Pluto and is nearly identical in composition, which has led to the hypothesis that the two share a common origin.

This has been further supported in a 2024 study of the chemical composition of Pluto and Triton which suggests they originated in the same region of the outer Solar System before the latter was pulled into Neptune's orbit.

The proposed capture of Triton may explain several features of the Neptunian system, including the extremely eccentric orbit of Neptune's moon Nereid and the scarcity of moons as compared to the other giant planets. Triton's initially eccentric orbit would have intersected the orbits of Neptune's original moons and disrupted them, dispersing them through gravitational interactions.

Triton's eccentric post-capture orbit would have also resulted in tidal heating of its interior, which could have kept Triton fluid for a billion years; this inference is supported by evidence of differentiation in Triton's interior. This source of internal heat disappeared following tidal locking and circularization of the orbit.

Two types of mechanisms have been proposed for Triton's capture. To be gravitationally captured by a planet, a passing body must lose sufficient energy to be slowed down to a speed less than that required to escape. An early model of how Triton may have been slowed was by collision with another object, either one that happened to be passing by Neptune (which is unlikely), or a moon or proto-moon in orbit around Neptune (which is more likely). A more recent hypothesis suggests that, before its capture, Triton was part of a binary system. When this binary encountered Neptune, it interacted in such a way that the binary dissociated, with one portion of the binary expelled, and the other, Triton, becoming bound to Neptune. This event is more likely for more massive companions. This hypothesis is supported by several lines of evidence, including binaries being very common among the large Kuiper belt objects. The event was brief but gentle, saving Triton from collisional disruption. Events like this may have been common during the formation of Neptune, or later when it migrated outward.

However, simulations in 2017 showed that after Triton's capture, and before its orbital eccentricity decreased, it probably did collide with at least one other moon, and caused collisions between other moons.

== Physical characteristics ==
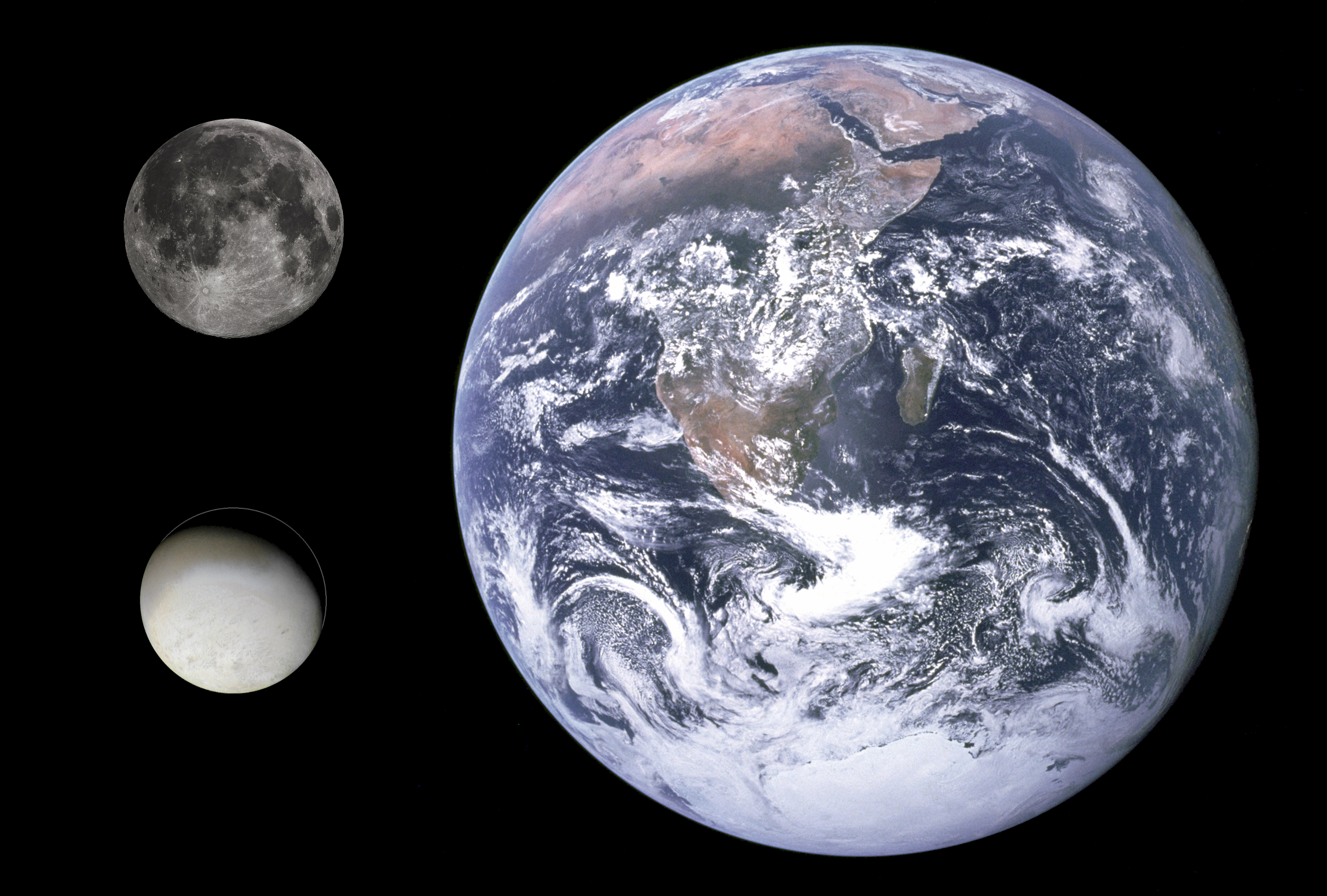
Triton (lower left) compared to the Moon (upper left) and Earth (right), to scale

Triton dominates the Neptunian moon system, with over 99.5% of its total mass. This imbalance may reflect the elimination of many of Neptune's original satellites following Triton's capture.

Triton is the seventh-largest moon and sixteenth-largest object in the Solar System and is modestly larger than the dwarf planets Pluto and Eris. It is the largest-known object believed to have originated in the Kuiper Belt. It is also the largest retrograde moon in the Solar System. It accounts for more than 99.5% of all the mass known to orbit Neptune, including the planet's rings and fifteen other known moons, (Note: Mass of Triton: 2.14×10^{22} kg. Combined mass of 12 other known moons of Neptune: 7.53×10^{19} kg, or 0.35%. The mass of the rings is negligible.) and is also more massive than all known moons in the Solar System smaller than itself combined. (Note: The masses of other spherical moons are: Titania—3.5×10^{21}, Oberon—3.1×10^{21}, Rhea—2.3×10^{21}, Iapetus—1.8×10^{21}, Charon—1.6×10^{21}, Ariel—1.2×10^{21}, Umbriel—1.3×10^{21}, Dione—1.1×10^{21}, Tethys—0.6×10^{21}, Enceladus—0.11×10^{21}, Miranda—0.06×10^{21}, Mimas—0.04×10^{21}. The total mass of remaining moons is about 0.12×10^{21}. So, the total mass of all moons smaller than Triton is about 1.68×10^{22}. (See List of Solar System objects by size)) Also, with a diameter 5.5% that of Neptune, it is the largest moon of a gas giant relative to its planet in terms of diameter, although Titan is bigger relative to Saturn in terms of mass (the ratio of Triton's mass to that of Neptune is approximately 1:4788, whereas the ratio of Titan's mass to that of Saturn is approximately 1:4225). It has a radius, density (2.061 g/cm^{3}), temperature, and chemical composition similar to that of Pluto.

Triton's surface is covered with a transparent layer of annealed frozen nitrogen. Only 40% of Triton's surface has been observed and studied, but it may be entirely covered in such a thin sheet of nitrogen ice. Triton's surface consists of 55% nitrogen ice with other ices mixed in. Water ice comprises 15–35% and frozen carbon dioxide (dry ice) the remaining 10–20%. Trace ices include 0.1% methane and 0.05% carbon monoxide. There could also be ammonia ice on the surface, as there are indications of ammonia dihydrate in the lithosphere. Triton's mean density implies that it probably consists of about 30–45% water ice (including relatively small amounts of volatile ices), with the remainder being rocky material. Triton's surface area is 23 million km^{2}, which is 4.5% of Earth, or 15.5% of Earth's land area. Triton has an unusually high albedo, reflecting 60–95% of the sunlight that reaches it, and it has changed only slightly since the first observations. By comparison, the Moon reflects only 11%. This high albedo causes Triton to reflect a lot of whatever little sunlight there is instead of absorbing it, causing it to have the coldest recorded temperature in the Solar System at 38 K (−235 °C). Triton's reddish color is thought to be the result of methane ice, which is converted to tholins under exposure to ultraviolet radiation.

Color image of Triton, showing its varied surface.

Because Triton's surface indicates a long history of melting, models of its interior posit that Triton is differentiated, like Earth, into a solid core, a mantle and a crust. Water, the most abundant volatile in the Solar System, comprises Triton's mantle, enveloping a core of rock and metal. There is enough rock in Triton's interior for radioactive decay to maintain a liquid subsurface ocean to this day, similar to what is thought to exist beneath the surface of Europa and several other icy outer Solar System worlds. This is not thought to be adequate to power convection in Triton's icy crust. However, the strong obliquity tides are believed to generate enough additional heat to accomplish this and produce the observed signs of recent surface geological activity. The black material ejected is suspected to contain organic compounds, and if liquid water is present on Triton, it has been speculated that this could make it habitable for some form of life.

== Atmosphere ==
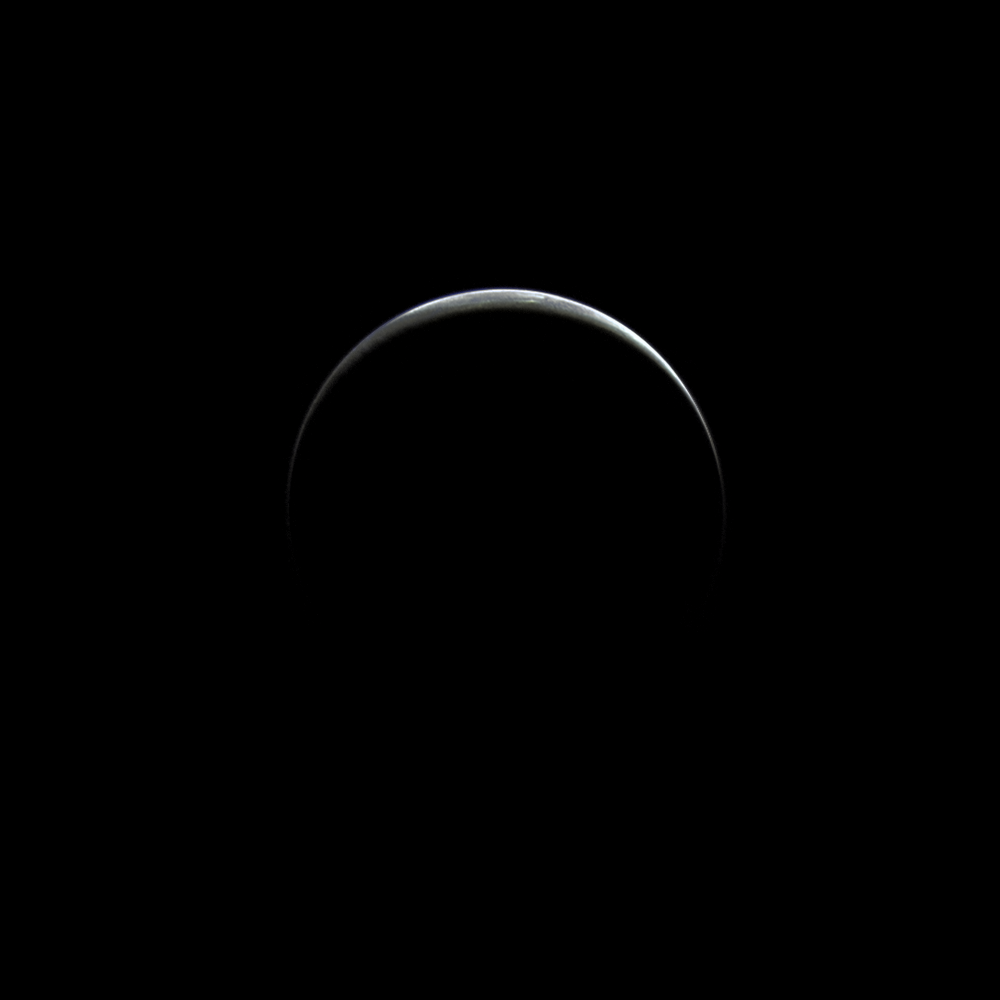
Departing image of Triton, showing its hazy atmosphere illuminated by sunlight and "extending" its crescent

Triton has a tenuous but well-structured and global nitrogen atmosphere, with trace amounts of carbon monoxide and small amounts of methane near its surface. Like Pluto's atmosphere, the atmosphere of Triton is thought to result from the evaporation of nitrogen from its surface. Its surface temperature is at least 35.6 K (−237.6 °C) because Triton's nitrogen ice is in the warmer, hexagonal crystalline state, and the phase transition between hexagonal and cubic nitrogen ice occurs at that temperature. An upper limit in the low 40s (K) can be set from vapor pressure equilibrium with nitrogen gas in Triton's atmosphere. This is colder than Pluto's average equilibrium temperature of 44 K (−229.2 °C). Triton's surface atmospheric pressure is only about 1.4–1.9 Pa (0.014–0.019 mbar).

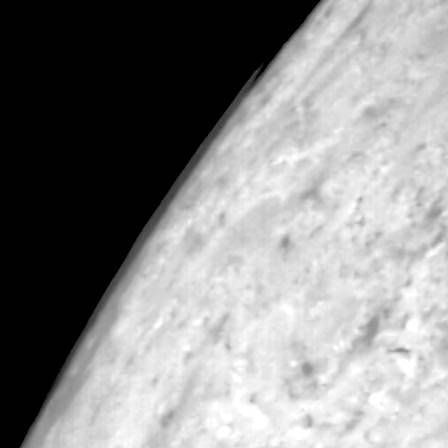
Clouds observed above Triton's limb by Voyager 2

Turbulence at Triton's surface creates a troposphere (a "weather region") rising to an altitude of 8 km. Streaks on Triton's surface left by geyser plumes suggest that the troposphere is driven by seasonal winds capable of moving material over a micrometer in size. Unlike other atmospheres, Triton's lacks a stratosphere and instead has a thermosphere from altitudes of 8 to 950 km and an exosphere above that. The temperature of Triton's upper atmosphere, at 95±5 K, is higher than that at its surface, due to heat absorbed from solar radiation and Neptune's magnetosphere. A haze permeates most of Triton's troposphere, thought to be composed largely of hydrocarbons and nitriles created by the action of sunlight on methane. Triton's atmosphere also has clouds of condensed nitrogen that lie between 1 and 3 km from its surface.

In 1997, observations from Earth were made of Triton's limb as it passed in front of stars. These observations indicated a denser atmosphere than was deduced from Voyager 2 data. Other observations have shown an increase in temperature by 5% from 1989 to 1998. These observations indicated Triton was approaching an unusually warm southern hemisphere summer season that happens only once every few hundred years. Hypotheses for this warming include a change of frost patterns on Triton's surface and a change in ice albedo, which would allow more heat to be absorbed. Another hypothesis argues that temperature changes are a result of the deposition of dark, red material from geological processes. Because Triton's Bond albedo is among the highest in the Solar System, it is sensitive to small variations in spectral albedo. Based on the increase in atmospheric pressure between 1989 and 1997, it is estimated that by 2010 Triton's atmospheric pressure may have increased to as much as 4 Pa. By 2017, however, Triton's atmospheric surface pressure had nearly returned to Voyager 2 levels; the cause for the rapid spike in atmospheric pressure between 1989 and 2017 remains unexplained.

== Surface features ==
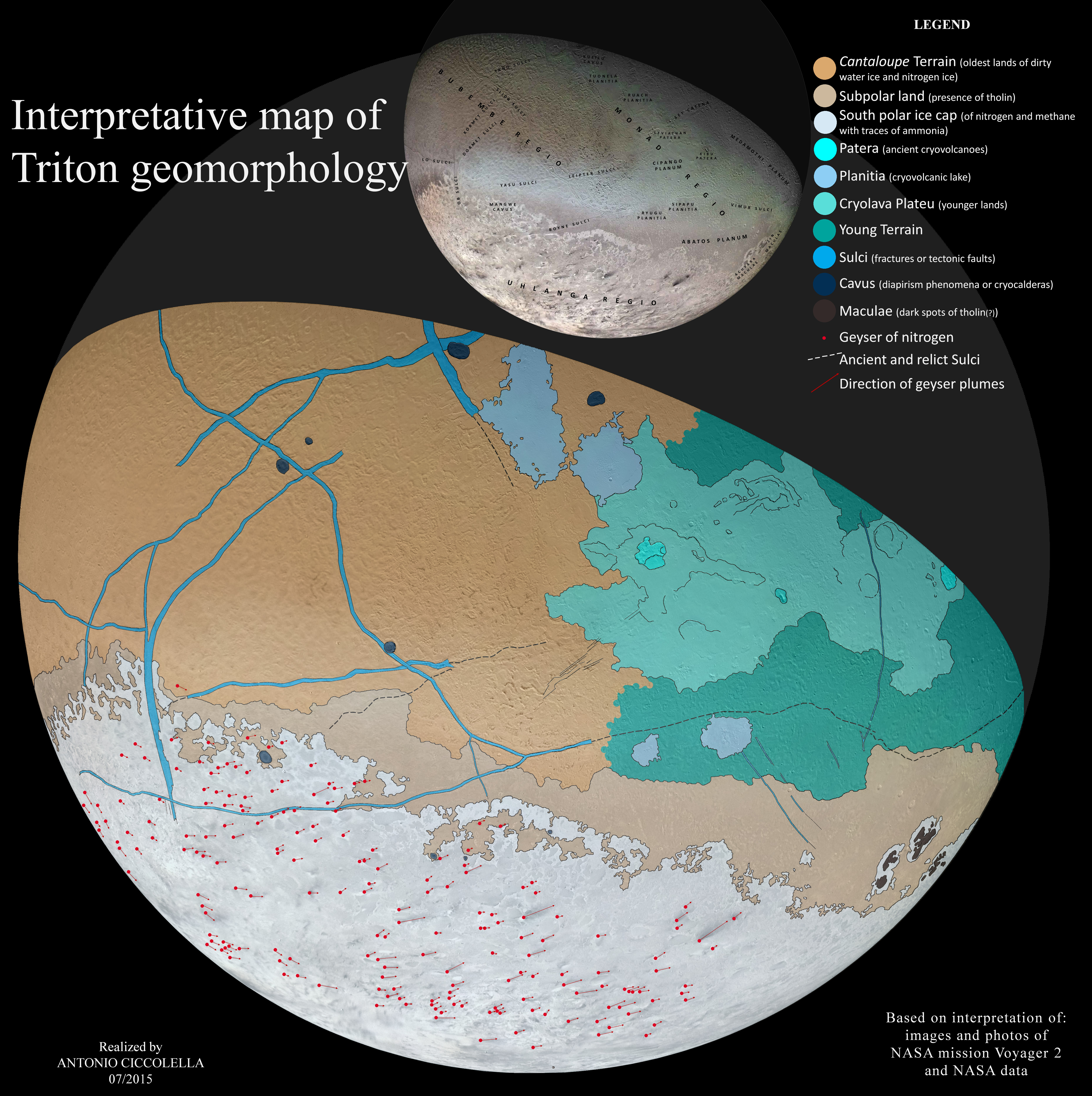
Interpretative geomorphological map of Triton

All detailed knowledge of the surface of Triton was acquired from a distance of 40,000 km by the Voyager 2 spacecraft during a single encounter in 1989. The 40% of Triton's surface imaged by Voyager 2 revealed blocky outcrops, ridges, troughs, furrows, hollows, plateaus, icy plains, and a few craters. Triton is relatively flat; its observed topography never varies beyond a kilometer. The impact craters observed are concentrated almost entirely in Triton's leading hemisphere. Analysis of crater density and distribution has suggested that in geological terms, Triton's surface is extremely young, with regions varying from an estimated 50 million years old to just an estimated 6 million years old. Fifty-five percent of Triton's surface is covered with frozen nitrogen, with water ice comprising 15–35% and frozen CO_{2} forming the remaining 10–20%. The surface also has deposits of tholins, a dark, tarry slurry of various organic chemical compounds.

=== Cryovolcanism ===
One of the largest cryovolcanic features found on Triton is Leviathan Patera, a caldera-like feature roughly 100 km in diameter seen near the equator. Surrounding this caldera is a massive cryovolcanic plain, Cipango Planum, which is at least 490,000 km^{2} in area; assuming Leviathan Patera is the primary vent, Leviathan Patera is one of the largest volcanic or cryovolcanic constructs in the Solar System. This feature is also connected to two enormous cryolava lakes seen northwest of the caldera. Because the cryolava on Triton is believed to be primarily water ice with some ammonia, these lakes would qualify as stable bodies of surface liquid water while they were molten. This is the first place such bodies have been found apart from Earth, and Triton is the only icy body known to feature cryolava lakes, although similar cryomagmatic extrusions can be seen on Ariel, Ganymede, Charon, and Titan.

=== Plumes ===
The Voyager 2 probe in 1989 observed a handful of geyser-like eruptions of nitrogen gas or water and entrained dust from beneath the surface of Triton in plumes up to 8 km high. Triton is thus one of the few bodies in the Solar System on which active eruptions of some sort have been observed. The best-observed examples are the Hili plume and Mahilani plume (named after a Zulu water sprite and a Tongan sea spirit, respectively).

The precise mechanism behind Triton's plumes is debated; one hypothesis is that Triton's plumes are driven by solar heating underneath a transparent or translucent layer of nitrogen ice, creating a sort of "solid greenhouse effect". As solar radiation warms the darker material beneath, this causes a rapid increase in pressure as the nitrogen begins to sublimate until enough pressure accumulates for it to erupt through the translucent layer. This model is largely supported by the observation that Triton was near peak southern summer at the time of Voyager 2's flyby, ensuring its southern polar cap was receiving prolonged sunlight. CO_{2} geysers on Mars are thought to erupt from its south polar cap each spring in the same way.

The significant geological activity on Triton has led to alternative proposals that the plumes may be cryovolcanic in nature, rather than driven by solar radiation. A cryovolcanic origin better explains the estimated output of Triton's plumes, which possibly exceeds 400 kilograms per second (880 lb/s). This is similar to that which is estimated for Enceladus's cryovolcanic plumes at 200 kg/s (440 lb/s). If Triton's plumes are cryovolcanically driven, it remains to be explained why they predominantly appear over its southern polar cap. Triton's high surface heat flux may directly melt or vaporize nitrogen ice at the base of its polar caps, creating 'hot spots' which break through the ice or move to the ice caps' margins, before erupting explosively.

Though only observed up close once by the Voyager 2 spacecraft, it is estimated that a plume eruption on Triton may last up to a year.

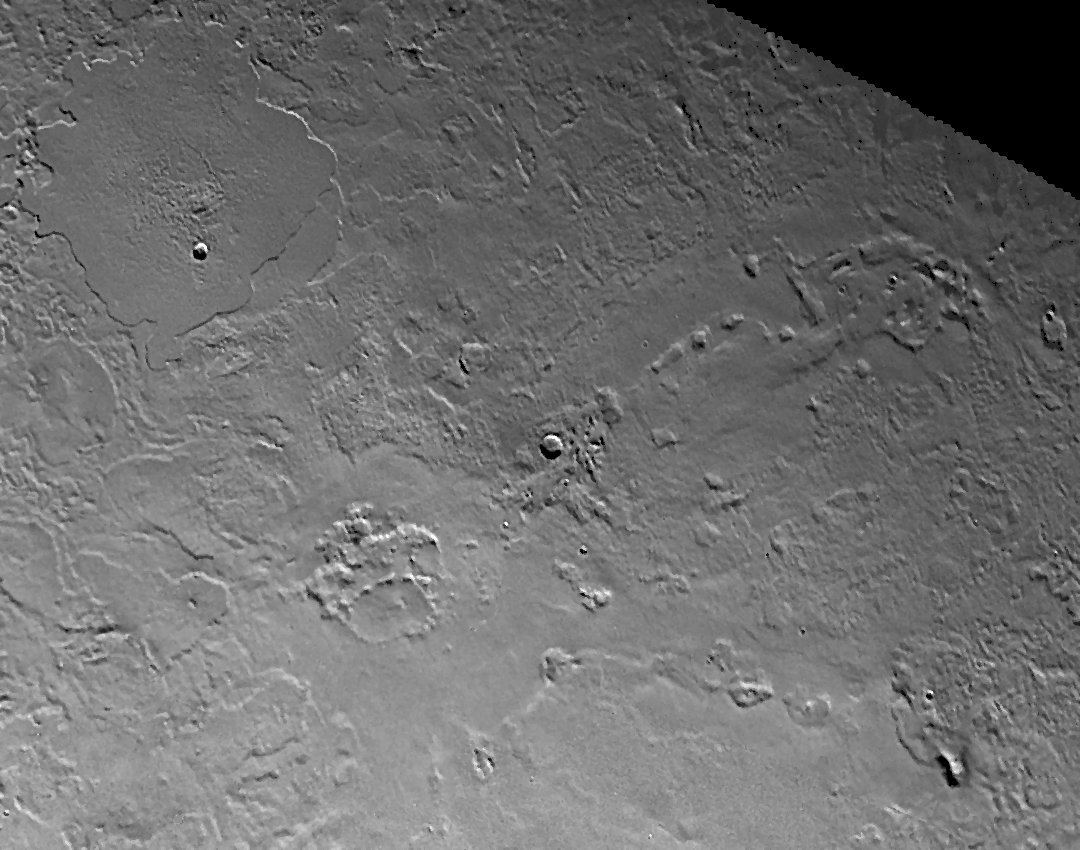
Close up of the volcanic province of Leviathan Patera, the caldera in the center of the image. Kraken Catena and Set Catena extend radially from the caldera to the right and upper-right of the image, while Ruach Planitia is seen to the upper left. Just off-screen to the lower left is a fault zone aligned radially with the caldera, indicating a close connection between the tectonics and volcanology of this geologic unit.

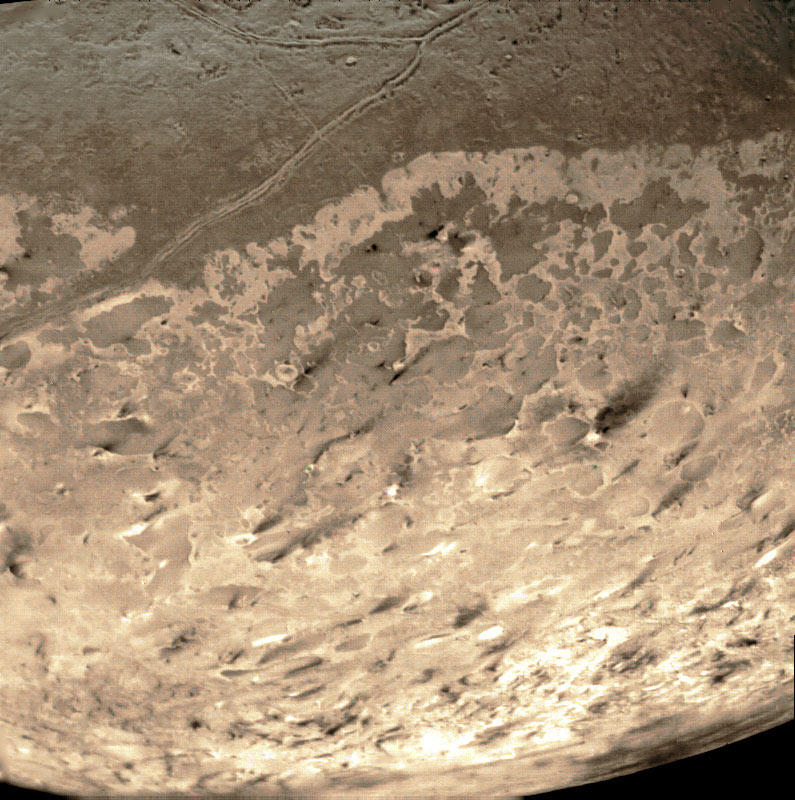
Dark streaks across Triton's south polar cap surface, thought to be dust deposits left by eruptions of nitrogen geysers

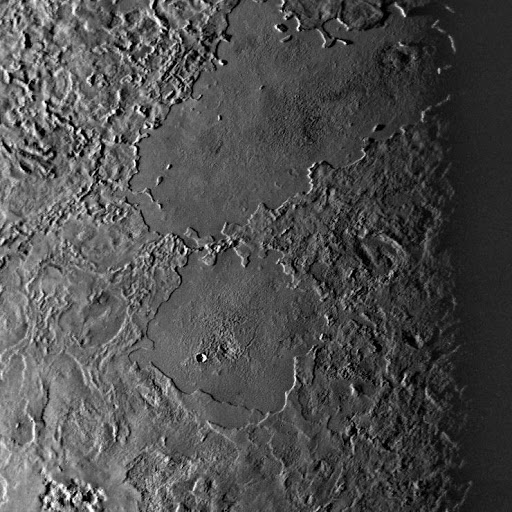
Two large cryolava lakes on Triton, seen west of Leviathan Patera. Combined, they are nearly the size of Kraken Mare on Titan. These features are unusually crater free, indicating they are young and were recently molten.

=== Polar cap, plains and ridges ===
Triton's bright south polar cap above a region of cantaloupe terrain

Triton's south polar region is covered by a highly reflective cap of frozen nitrogen and methane sprinkled by impact craters and openings of geysers. Little is known about the north pole because it was on the night side during the Voyager 2 encounter, but it is thought that Triton must also have a north polar ice cap.

The high plains found on Triton's eastern hemisphere, such as Cipango Planum, cover over and blot out older features, and are therefore almost certainly the result of icy lava washing over the previous landscape. The plains are dotted with pits, such as Leviathan Patera, which are probably the vents from which this lava emerged. The composition of the lava is unknown, although a mixture of ammonia and water is suspected.

Four roughly circular "walled plains" have been identified on Triton. They are the flattest regions so far discovered, with a variance in altitude of less than 200 m. They are thought to have formed from the eruption of icy lava. The plains near Triton's eastern limb are dotted with black spots, the maculae. Some maculae are simple dark spots with diffuse boundaries, and others comprise a dark central patch surrounded by a white halo with sharp boundaries. The maculae typically have diameters of about 100 km and widths of the halos of between 20 and 30 km.

There are extensive ridges and valleys in complex patterns across Triton's surface, probably the result of freeze–thaw cycles. Many also appear to be tectonic and may result from an extension or strike-slip faulting. There are long double ridges of ice with central troughs bearing a strong resemblance to Europan lineae (although they have a larger scale), and which may have a similar origin, possibly shear heating from strike-slip motion along faults caused by diurnal tidal stresses experienced before Triton's orbit was fully circularized. These faults with parallel ridges expelled from the interior cross complex terrain with valleys in the equatorial region. The ridges and furrows, or sulci, such as Yasu Sulci, Ho Sulci, and Lo Sulci, are thought to be of intermediate age in Triton's geological history, and in many cases to have formed concurrently. They tend to be clustered in groups or "packets".

=== Cantaloupe terrain ===
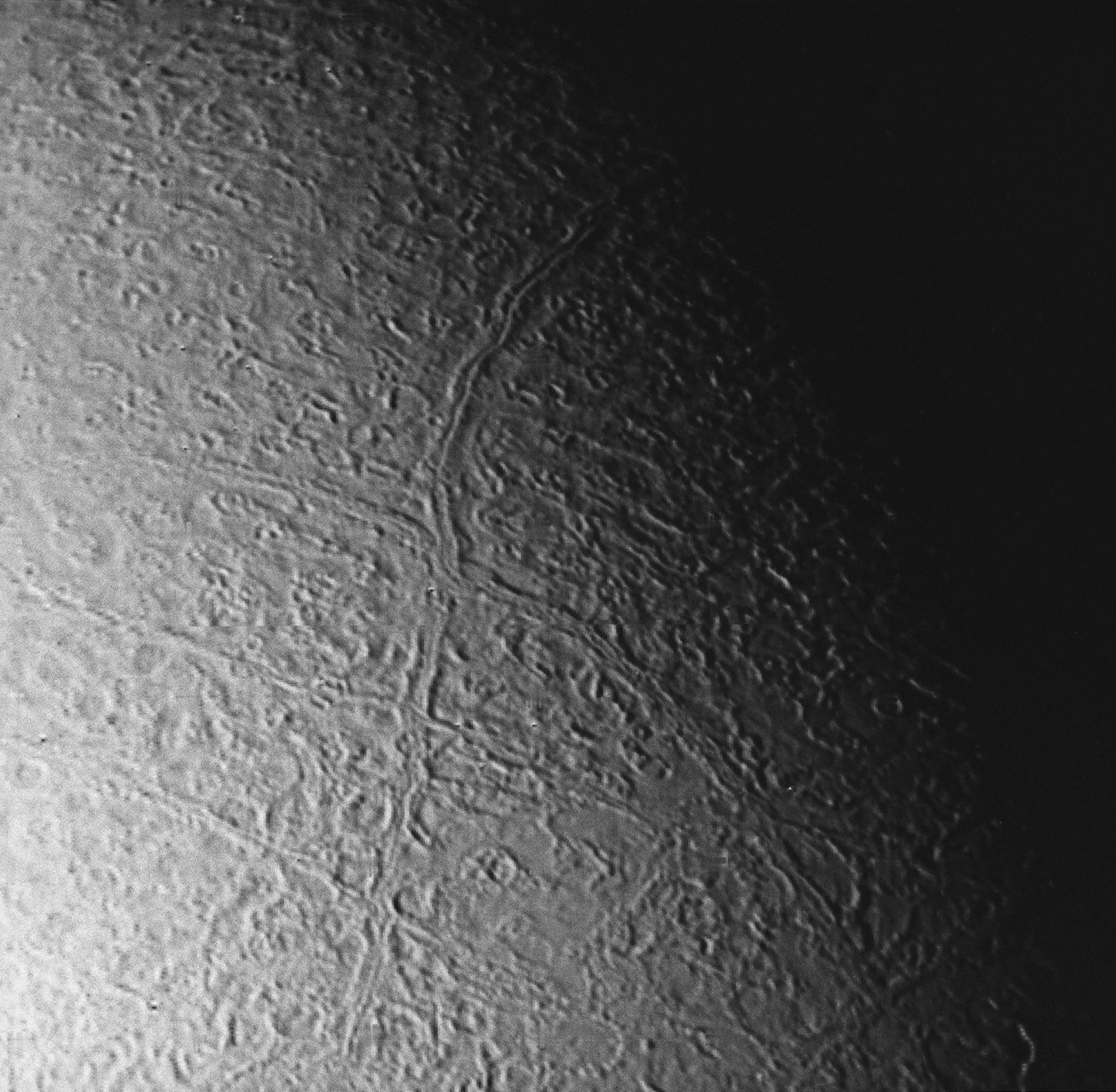
Cantaloupe terrain viewed from 130,000 km by Voyager 2, with crosscutting Europa-like double ridges. Slidr Sulci (vertical) and Tano Sulci form the prominent "X".

Triton's western hemisphere consists of a strange series of fissures and depressions known as "cantaloupe terrain" because it resembles the skin of a cantaloupe melon. Although it has few craters, it is thought that this is the oldest terrain on Triton. It probably covers much of Triton's western half.

Cantaloupe terrain, which is mostly dirty water ice, is only known to exist on Triton. It contains depressions 30–40 km in diameter. The depressions (cavi) are probably not impact craters because they are all of the similar size and have smooth curves. The leading hypothesis for their formation is diapirism, the rising of "lumps" of less dense material through a stratum of denser material. Alternative hypotheses include formation by collapses, or by flooding caused by cryovolcanism.

=== Impact craters ===
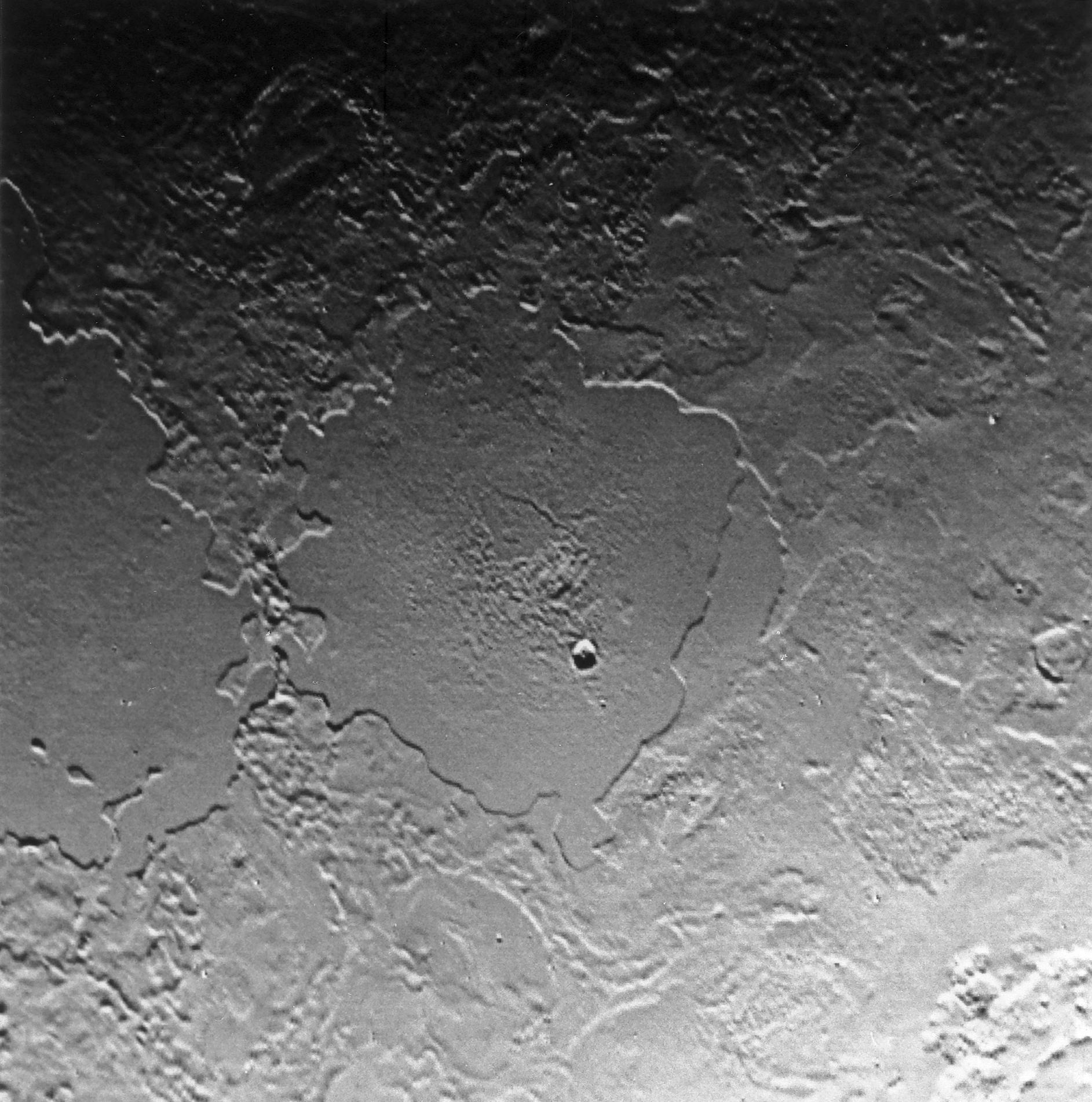
Tuonela Planitia (left) and Ruach Planitia (center) are two of Triton's cryovolcanic "walled plains". The paucity of craters is evidence of extensive, relatively recent, geologic activity.

Due to constant erasure and modification by ongoing geological activity, impact craters on Triton's surface are relatively rare. A census of Triton's craters imaged by Voyager 2 found only 179 that were incontestably of impact origin, compared with 835 observed for Uranus's moon Miranda, which has only three percent of Triton's surface area. The largest crater observed on Triton thought to have been created by an impact is a 27-kilometer-diameter (17 mi) feature called Mazomba. Although larger craters have been observed, they are generally thought to be volcanic.

The few impact craters on Triton are almost all concentrated in the leading hemisphere—that facing the direction of the orbital motion—with the majority concentrated around the equator between 30° and 70° longitude, resulting from material swept up from orbit around Neptune. Because it orbits with one side permanently facing the planet, astronomers expect that Triton should have fewer impacts on its trailing hemisphere, due to impacts on the leading hemisphere being more frequent and more violent. Voyager 2 imaged only 40% of Triton's surface, so this remains uncertain. However, the observed cratering asymmetry exceeds what can be explained based on the impactor populations, and implies a younger surface age for the crater-free regions (≤ 6 million years old) than for the cratered regions (≤ 50 million years old).

== Observation and exploration ==
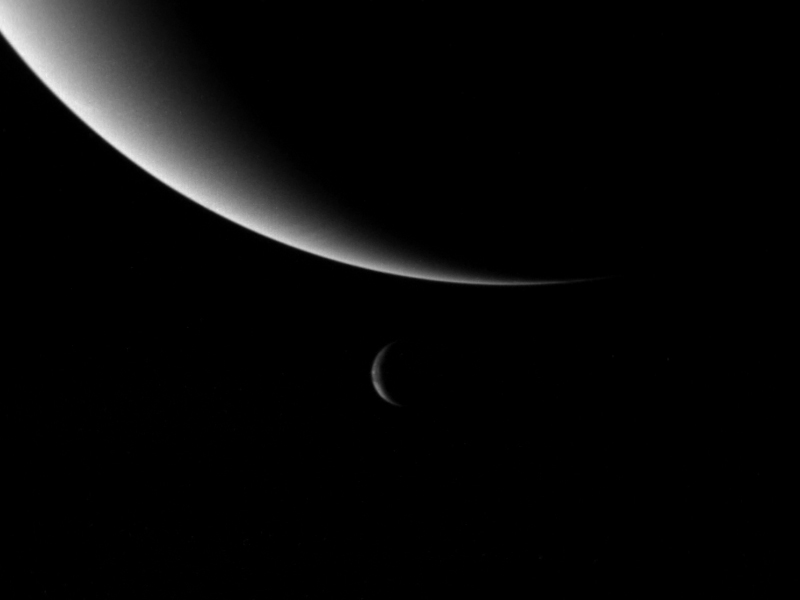
Neptune (top) and Triton (bottom) three days after flyby of Voyager 2

The orbital properties of Triton were already determined with high accuracy in the 19th century. It was found to have a retrograde orbit, at a very high angle of inclination to the plane of Neptune's orbit. The first detailed observations of Triton were not made until 1930. Little was known about the satellite until Voyager 2 flew by in 1989.

Before the flyby of Voyager 2, astronomers suspected that Triton might have liquid nitrogen seas and a nitrogen/methane atmosphere with a density as much as 30% that of Earth. Like the famous overestimates of the atmospheric density of Mars, this proved incorrect. As with Mars, a denser atmosphere is postulated for its early history.

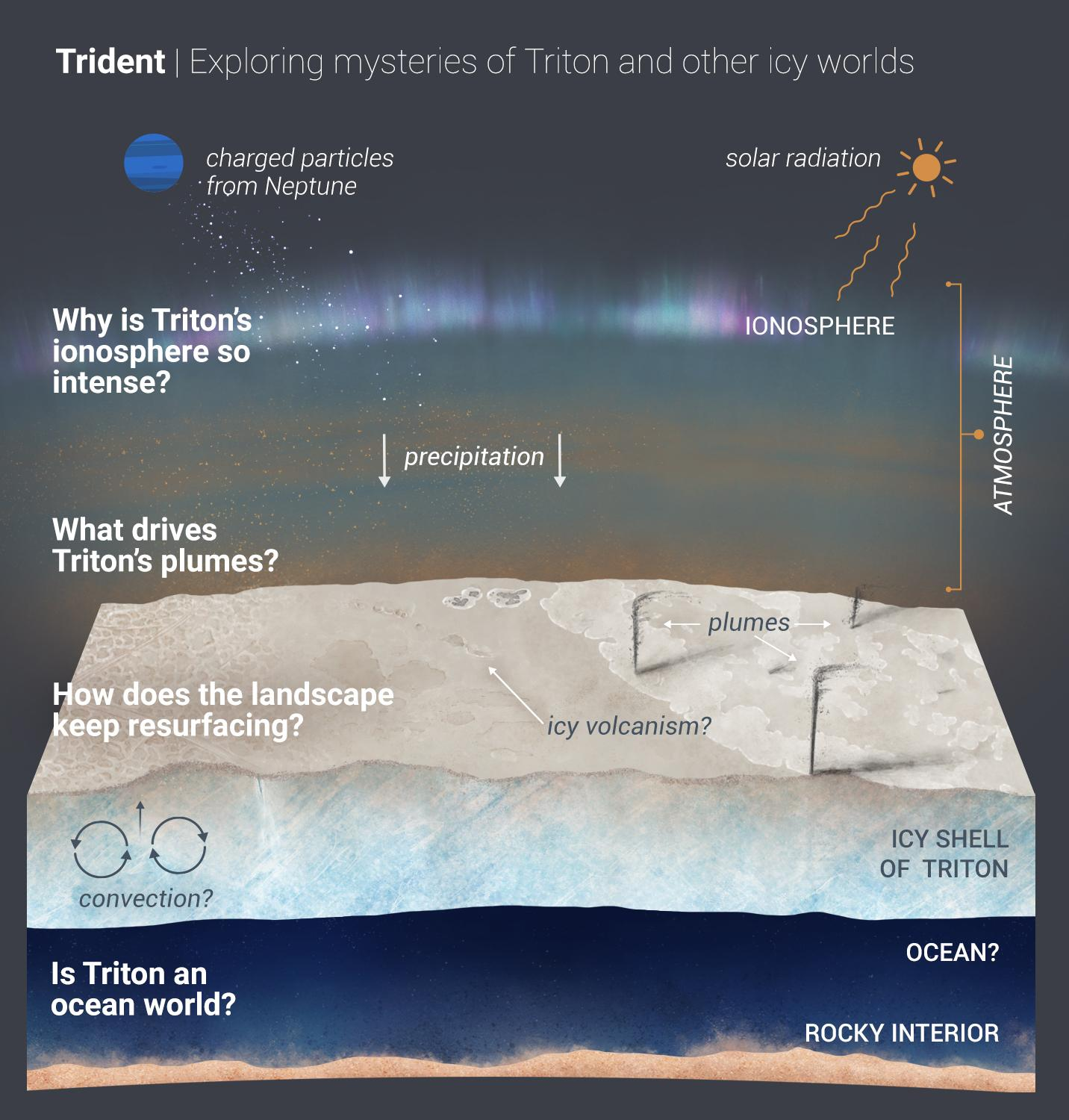
NASA illustration detailing the studies of the proposed Trident mission

The first attempt to measure the diameter of Triton was made by Gerard Kuiper in 1954. He obtained a value of 3,800 km. Subsequent measurement attempts arrived at values ranging from 2,500 to 6,000 km, or from slightly smaller than the Moon (3,474.2 km) to nearly half the diameter of Earth. Data from the approach of Voyager 2 to Neptune on August 25, 1989, led to a more accurate estimate of Triton's diameter (2,706 km).

In the 1990s, various observations from Earth were made of the limb of Triton using the occultation of nearby stars, which indicated the presence of an atmosphere and an exotic surface. Observations in late 1997 suggest that Triton is heating up and the atmosphere has become significantly denser since Voyager 2 flew past in 1989.

New concepts for missions to the Neptune system to be conducted in the 2010s were proposed by NASA scientists on numerous occasions over the last decades. All of them identified Triton as being a prime target and a separate Triton lander comparable to the Huygens probe for Titan was frequently included in those plans. No efforts aimed at Neptune and Triton went beyond the proposal phase and NASA's funding for missions to the outer Solar System is currently focused on the Jupiter and Saturn systems. A proposed lander mission to Triton, called Triton Hopper, would mine nitrogen ice from the surface of Triton and process it to be used as a propellant for a small rocket, enabling it to fly or 'hop' across the surface. Another concept, involving a flyby, was formally proposed in 2019 as part of NASA's Discovery Program under the name Trident. Neptune Odyssey is a mission concept for a Neptune orbiter with a focus on Triton being studied beginning April 2021 as a possible large strategic science mission by NASA that would launch in 2033 and arrive at the Neptune system in 2049. Two lower-cost mission concepts were subsequently developed for the New Frontiers program: the first the following June and the second in 2023. The first is Triton Ocean World Surveyor, which would launch in 2031 and arrive in 2047, and the second is Nautilus, which would launch August 2042 and arrive in April 2057.

== Maps ==
Enhanced-color map; leading hemisphere is on right

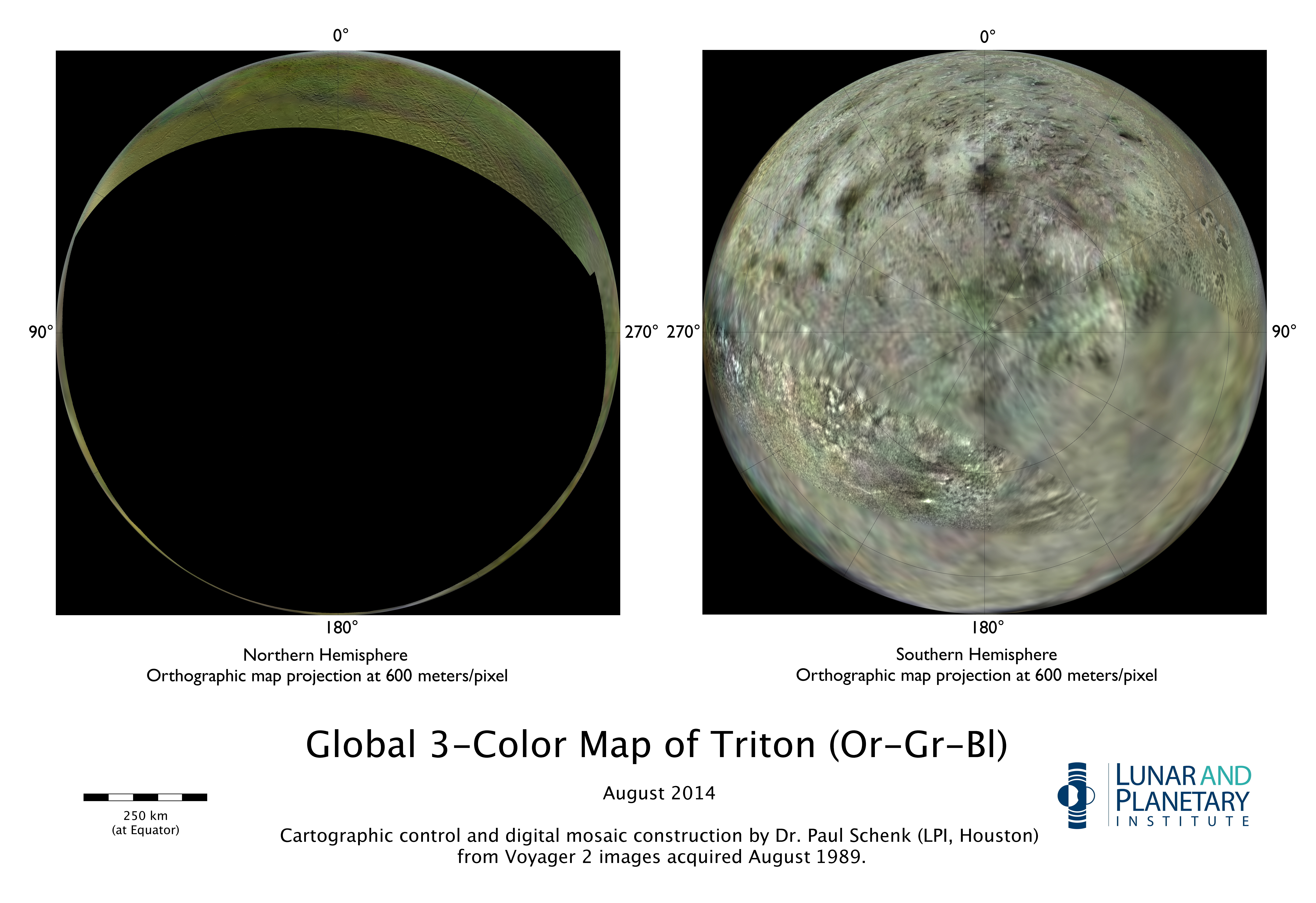
Enhanced-color polar maps; south is right

== See also ==
- List of natural satellites
- Geology of Triton
- Triton in fiction
- Triton's sky
- Shensuo, a proposed flyby mission to Triton
- Neptune Odyssey, a proposed orbiter mission to Triton
- Trident (spacecraft), a proposed flyby mission to Triton
- Triton Hopper, a proposed lander to Triton
