= Laplace-P =

Proposed Russian spacecraft to study the Jovian moon system and land on Ganymede

- Names: Europa Lander (2009–2011)
- Mission type: Exploration by orbiter and lander
- Operator: Roscosmos
- Mission duration: ≥ 10 years

Spacecraft properties
- Launch mass: orbiter: 4,000 kg (8,800 lb) lander: 950 kg (2,090 lb)
- Dry mass: orbiter: 2,260 kg (4,980 lb) lander: 550 kg (1,210 lb)
- Payload mass: orbiter: 50 kg (110 lb) lander: 60 kg (130 lb)

Start of mission
- Launch date: 2026 (proposed)
- Rocket: Angara-A5 with the KVTK upper stage (proposed)

Orbital parameters
- Perijove altitude: 900,000 km (560,000 mi)
- Apojove altitude: 20,000,000 km (12,000,000 mi)
- Period: 200 days

Ganymede lander
- Landing date: 2030 (proposed)

Laplace-P (Russian: Лаплас — П, formerly called Europa Lander) was a proposed orbiter and lander by the Russian Federal Space Agency designed to study the Jovian moon system and explore Ganymede with a lander.

Initially proposed to launch with the European Jupiter Icy Moons Explorer (JUICE) in 2022, this was later changed to an independent launch on an Angara-A5 in 2023. The mission was cancelled due to a lack of funding in 2017.

== History ==
The Europa Lander would have been launched in 2020s as part of the Europa Jupiter System Mission proposed in 2007 by the ESA to study the Jovian moon system as well as the planet Jupiter. The orbiter would have done several flybys of other Jovian moons before being placed in orbit around Europa. The lander would have researched the ocean underneath the ice sheet of Europa. However, to avoid the damaging effects of Jupiter's radiation belts, the destination of the lander was switched in 2011 from Europa to Ganymede. Ganymede is the largest moon in the Solar System and has an internal ocean that may contain more water than all of Earth's oceans together.

The orbiter would perform 13 flybys of Ganymede, and 4 flybys of Callisto and carry up to 50 kg (110 lb) of scientific instruments, while the Europa lander would have carried up to 70 kg (150 lb) of scientific instruments.

Laplace-P was cancelled in 2017 to allow more funding for the Venera-D mission.

== Concept ==
Artist's cut-away representation of the internal structure of Ganymede. Layers drawn to scale.

Laplace-P would be a dual mission featuring an orbiter (code name LP1) and a lander (code name LP2) to be launched together toward Jupiter. One spacecraft would orbit the moon Ganymede, while the lander would perform a soft landing on its surface. The "P" in Laplace-P stands for "posadka" (landing).

The planned trajectory is to use the VEEGA (Venus-Earth-Earth Gravity Assist) route. Both spacecraft would be carrying about 50 kg (110 lb) of scientific instruments each. The lander would be powered by an RTG, while the orbiter would be equipped either with an RTG or with solar panels. If the lander is launched together with JUICE, then the Russian orbiter would be omitted due to JUICE filling its role. The advanced Russian project Laplace-P orbiter's objectives is to map the surface for lander. The main objective of the lander is to carry out remote and in-situ investigations of Ganymede's surface.

The radiation conditions on the Ganymede surface are fairly benign. On the other hand, the Ganymedean gravitational parameter (GM = 9887.8 km^{3}/s^{2}) makes the landing on it from the orbit more difficult than in the case of Europa.

== Objectives ==
The main objectives of the mission would have been to study Ganymede's atmosphere, icy surface, habitability, and perform an in-situ search for biosignatures.

== See also ==
- Moons of Jupiter
- Europa Lander (NASA)
- Jupiter Icy Moons Explorer (JUICE)
