= Europa Clipper Magnetometer =

Europa Clipper's magnetometer instrument

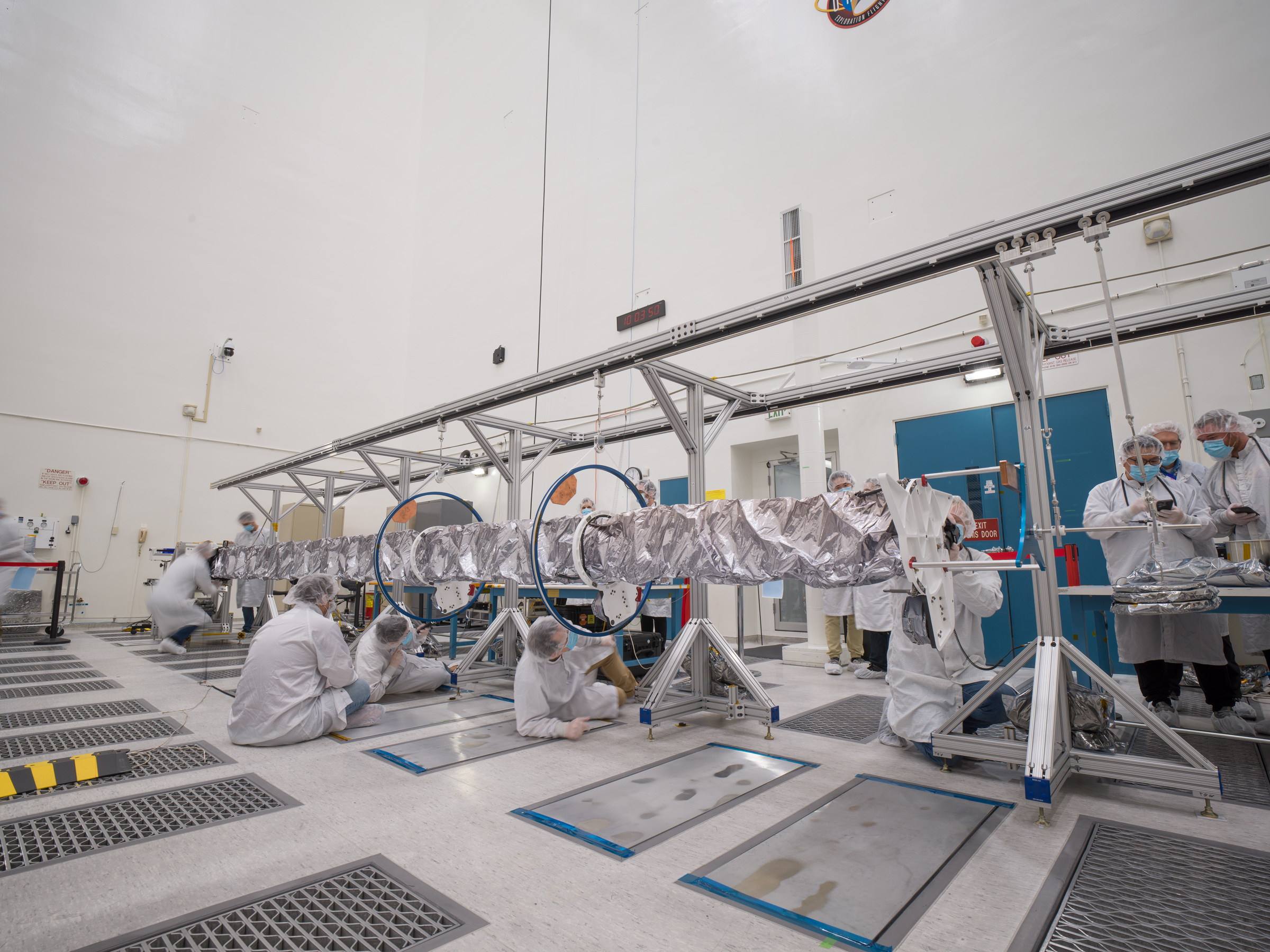
- Europa Clipper team deploys Magnetometer Boom
- Operator: NASA
- Manufacturer: Jet Propulsion Laboratory
- Instrument type: Magnetometer
- Function: Measuring magnetic field to characterize subsurface features
- Mission duration: Cruise: 3-6 years Science phase: ≥ 3 years

Properties
- Dimensions: 8.5 m (length, fully deployed)

Host spacecraft
- Spacecraft: Europa Clipper
- Operator: NASA
- Launch date: October 14, 2024, 16:06:00 UTC (12:06 p.m. EDT)
- Rocket: Falcon Heavy
- Launch site: Kennedy Space Center

The Europa Clipper Magnetometer (ECM) is a spacecraft magnetometer aboard the planned Europa Clipper mission. It will be used to precisely measure Europa's magnetic field during consecutive fly-bys, allowing scientists to potentially confirm the existence of Europa's hypothesised subsurface ocean. If this ocean exists, the instrument will be able to determine its depth and salinity, as well as the thickness of the moon's icy shell.

The magnetometer team is led by Margaret Kivelson, with Xianzhe Jia serving as deputy team leader.

== Overview ==
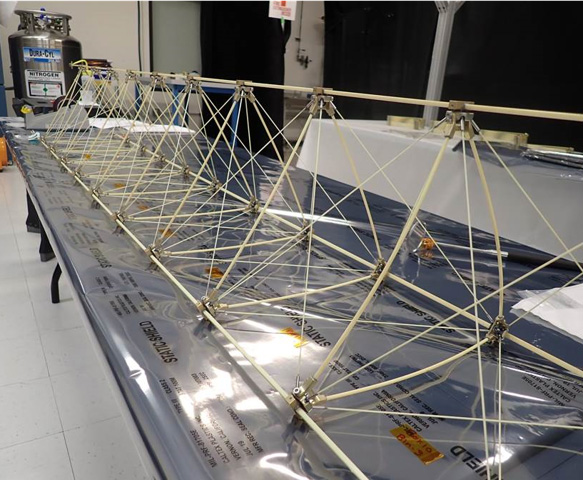
An exact replica of the boom that will be used for the magnetometer aboard Europa Clipper, designed as a test model.

The ECM is a highly sensitive and precise magnetometer used to measure small changes in the characteristics of Europa's magnetic field, studying how they vary according to time and location. The instrument will be stowed in a canister at launch, and will have a total of three flux-gate sensors attached to it. It will deploy to its full length of 8.5 meters (25 feet) in the days after launch.

The spacecraft contains over 300 individual sources of magnetic interference, such as magnets in the propulsion valves, and current loops in the solar arrays. As a result, the instrument will be mounted on an 8.5 meter boom to reduce the effect of this contamination, but will still need to be carefully calibrated in order to account for the effects of these artificial sources.

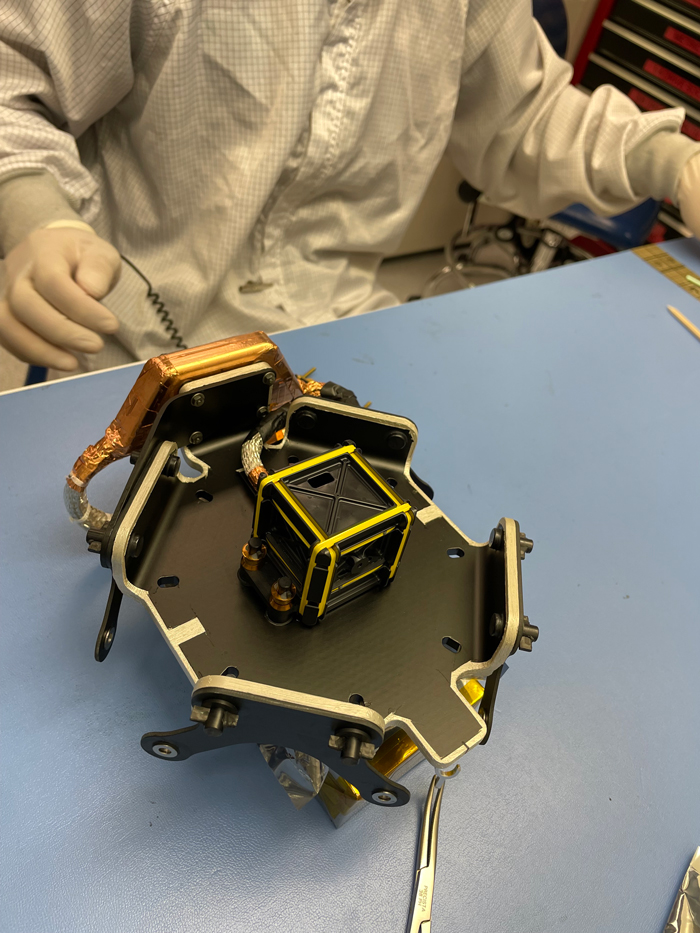
One of the three fluxgate sensors that will be mounted along the boom.

Originally, a more complex multi-frequency magnetometer (ICEMAG) was planned for inclusion aboard Europa Clipper. This instrument was ultimately scrapped, and later replaced with ECM due to cost overruns.

== Objectives ==
The primary objectives of the ECM instrument are:

- Confirm the existence of a subsurface ocean under Europa's icy surface
- If an ocean does exist, accurately measure its depth and salinity
- Characterize the ice shell by determining its thickness

== See also ==
- Large strategic science missions
- Europa Orbiter – Cancelled NASA orbiter mission to Europa
- Europa Lander – Cancelled NASA lander for Europa
- Exploration of Jupiter – Overview of the exploration of the planet Jupiter and its moons
- Jupiter Icy Moons Explorer – European mission to study Jupiter and its moons since 2023
- Jupiter Icy Moons Orbiter – Canceled NASA orbiter mission to Jupiter's icy moons
