= Themis (disambiguation) =

Themis is one of the twelve Titan children of Gaia and Uranus in Greek mythology.

Themis may also refer to:

== Space ==
- 24 Themis, an asteroid in the (main) asteroid belt
- THEMIS, a solar telescope located at the Teide Observatory
- Themis (hypothetical moon), a spurious tenth moon of Saturn
- THEMIS, Time History of Events and Macroscale Interactions during Substorms a constellation of five NASA satellites launched in 2007
- Thermal Emission Imaging System (THEMIS), an instrument on the 2001 Mars Odyssey orbiter
- Europa Thermal Emission Imaging System (E-THEMIS), a version of the THEMIS camera flown on the Europa Clipper
- Themis programme, a European prototype of reusable launch system to fly around 2025

== Other ==
- Themis (alga), a genus of red algae in the family Bangiaceae
- THEMIS (protein), a protein in humans, required for proper maturation of T cells
- Themis (solar power plant), a former solar power plant in Targassonne, France
- Themis, a local nymph of the Arcadia
- THeMIS, Tracked Hybrid Modular Infantry System, an unmanned ground vehicle built by Milrem Robotics
- The Themis Files, a book series by Sylvain Neuvel
- Tears of Themis, a game by miHoYo/HoYoverse
