= Interior Characterization of Europa using Magnetometry =

Cancelled magnetometer for Europa Clipper

ICEMAG
- Operator: NASA
- Manufacturer: Jet Propulsion Laboratory
- Instrument type: Magnetometer
- Function: internal planetary characterization and exosphere activity
- Mission duration: Cruise: 3-6 years Science phase: ≥ 3 years

Host spacecraft
- Spacecraft: Europa Clipper
- Operator: NASA
- Launch date: ≈ 2025 (instrument cancelled)
- Rocket: SLS
- Launch site: Kennedy Space Center

The Interior Characterization of Europa using Magnetometry (ICEMAG) is a multi-frequency magnetometer that was proposed to be flown on board the Europa Clipper mission to Jupiter's moon Europa, but its inclusion was cancelled in March 2019. Magnetic induction is a powerful tool for probing the subsurface and determine Europa's ocean depth, salinity, and ice shell thickness, as well as detecting erupting plume activity.

The Principal Investigator is Carol Raymond, at NASA's Jet Propulsion Laboratory.

On March 5, 2019, NASA's Associate Administrator for the Science Mission Directorate, Thomas Zurbuchen, announced that ICEMAG would no longer be part of the Europa Clipper mission, primarily citing recurring cost increases (over three times the original cost put forward in the proposal). A less complex magnetometer was included on the mission.

== Overview ==
Magnetic induction is a powerful tool for probing the subsurface. ICEMAG would have observed the magnetic field near Europa with greatly enhanced sensitivity compared to a similar instrument carried by NASA's Galileo spacecraft, which orbited Jupiter from 1995 to 2003. The magnetic field induced in Europa over many frequencies would reveal the ocean depth and ice shell thickness, especially when combined with the REASON ice penetrating radar data and the PIMS instrument. Knowledge of the ocean properties would help understand Europa's evolution and allow evaluation of processes that have cycled material between the depths and the surface, and would help assess the ocean's potential habitability. ICEMAG would have helped in understanding not only what Europa is made of, but also the processes that link the ocean to the surface, and how the system works.

ICEMAG was to utilize fluxgate magnetic field sensors and helium sensors in an integrated magnetic measurement system. Electromagnetic waves between 10^{−2} to 1 hertz could reveal localized mass flow of ions arising from plumes and the atmosphere; that is, localized transient currents indicate plume activity. In general, ICEMAG data would have combined synergistically with other data sets to improve knowledge of interior properties and exosphere activity.

The instrument was put under review in the summer of 2018 due to out of control costs. By March 6, 2019, the instrument was cancelled in favor of finding a more affordable, less complex replacement. The cause of the cost increases was traced to the helium sensors used to detect the direction and strength of a magnetic field.

== Objectives ==
The objectives of the ICEMAG investigation were to be:

- Constrain Europa's thermal evolution and current interior state
- Identify the source of the Europan atmosphere and processes by which it is lost
- Understand coupling between Europa and Jupiter's ionospheres and coupling of plumes to the flowing plasma
- Determine the location, thickness and salinity of the Europan ocean
- Locate of any active vents, plumes, and ionized plasma trails, the strength of plumes, and loss rates from the atmosphere
- Determine the strength of electric currents and plasma coupling Jupiter to Europa

== See also ==
- Spacecraft magnetometer
- Magnetometer (Juno)
- FIELDS
