= Phil Christensen =

American planetary scientist

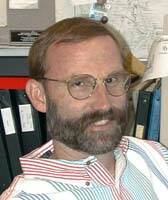
- photo courtesy NASA/JPL-Caltech (2005)
- Born: 1953 (age 72–73); Utah
- Education: University of California, Los Angeles (BS, MS, PhD)
- Awards: Whipple Award (2018)
- Scientific career
- Fields: Planetary geology
- Workplaces: Arizona State University

Philip Russel Christensen (born 1953) is a geologist whose research interests focus on the composition, physical properties, processes, and morphology of planetary surfaces, with an emphasis on Mars and the Earth. He is currently a Regents' Professor and the Ed and Helen Korrick Professor of Geological Sciences at Arizona State University (ASU).

== Education ==
Christensen earned his B.S. degree in geology from the University of California, Los Angeles (UCLA) in 1976. He earned his M.S. in 1978 and his Ph.D. in 1981 in geophysics and space physics, both from UCLA.

== Career ==
Along with serving on the faculty of the Department of Geology at Arizona State University since 1981, Christensen is the principal investigator for the Mars Global Surveyor Thermal Emission Spectrometer (TES), the Mars Odyssey THEMIS, the Europa Clipper Europa Thermal Emission Imaging System and the Lucy Thermal Emission Spectrometer instruments, as well as a co-investigator for the Mars Exploration Rovers, responsible for the Mini-TES instruments. He also serves on the research staff of the Center for Meteorite Studies museum on the ASU campus and is the director of the Mars Space Flight Facility. He served as co-chair of the Planetary Science Decadal Survey in 2022, with Robin M. Canup.

His discovery (based on Thermal Emission Spectrometer data) of crystalline hematite in Meridiani Planum was instrumental in that area's choice as the landing site for the Mars Exploration Rover Opportunity.

== Awards and honors ==
- Christensen was awarded the Exceptional Scientific Achievement Medal by NASA in 2003, and was elected as a Fellow of the American Geophysical Union in 2004.
- In September, 2009, he served as chair of the Mars Panel of the National Research Council's 2013-2022 Decadal survey on planetary science.
- Asteroid 90388 Philchristensen, discovered by the Catalina Sky Survey in 2003, was named in his honor. The official naming citation was published by the Minor Planet Center on 12 July 2014 (M.P.C. 89085).
- In August, 2018, he was awarded the Whipple Award by AGU for his contributions to planetary science.
