= Europa Imaging System =

Europa Clipper's visible-light camera system

- Operator: NASA
- Instrument type: cameras
- Function: 3D topography
- Mission duration: Cruise: 3-6 years Science phase: ≥ 3 years

Properties
- Resolution: 0.5 m
- Spectral band: visible spectrum

Host spacecraft
- Spacecraft: Europa Clipper
- Operator: NASA
- Launch date: October 14, 2024, 16:06:00 UTC (12:06 p.m. EDT)
- Rocket: Falcon Heavy
- Launch site: Kennedy Space Center

The Europa Imaging System (EIS) is a visible spectrum wide and narrow angle camera on board the Europa Clipper mission that will map most of Europa at 50 m (160 ft) resolution, and will provide images of selected surface areas at up to 0.5 m resolution.

EIS will provide comprehensive data sets, including cartographic and three-dimensional geologic maps, regional and high-resolution digital topography, geographic information system data products, color and photometric data products, a geodetic control network tied to radar altimetry, and a database of plume-search observations.

== Overview ==
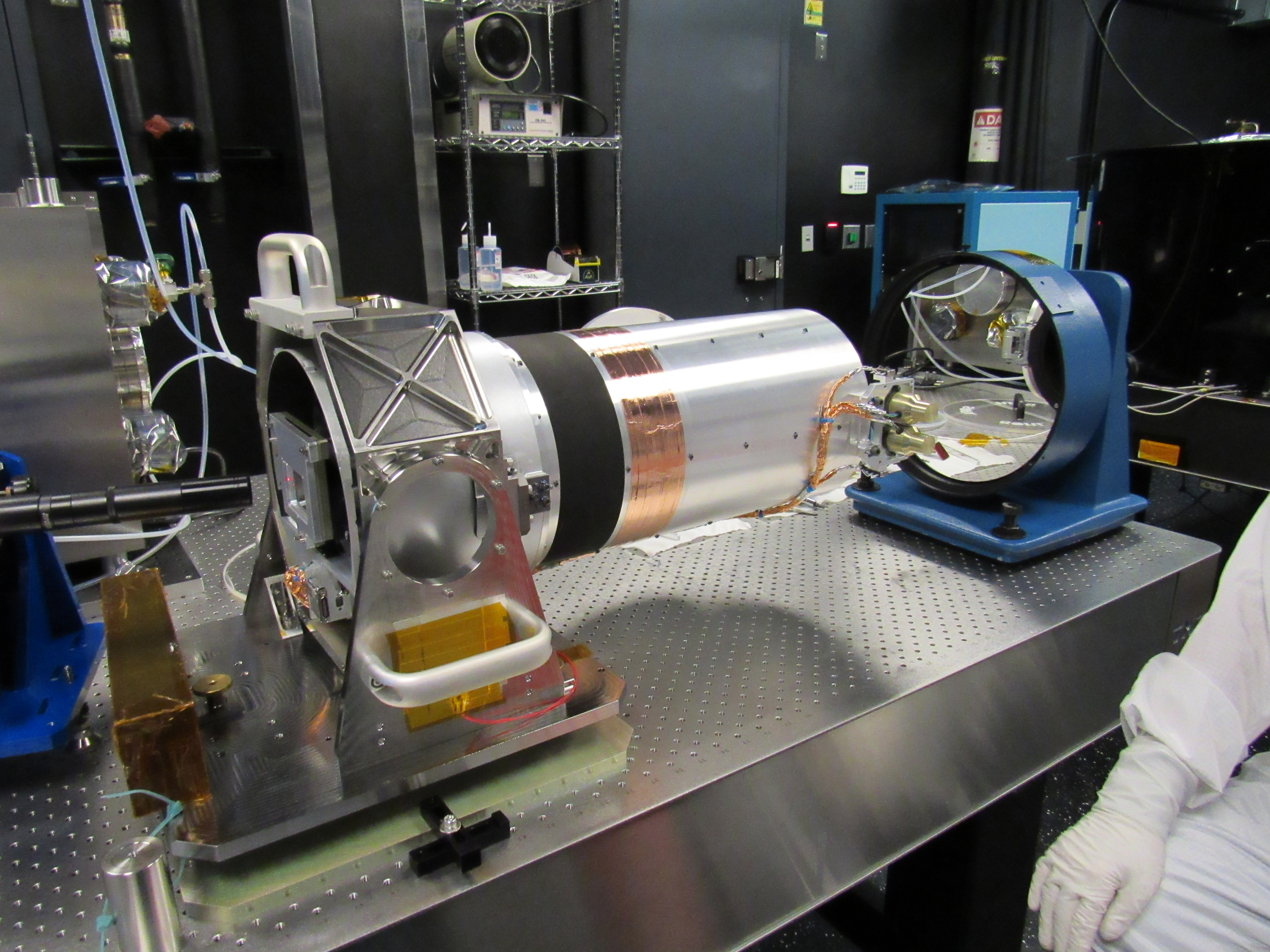
Europa Imaging System Optical Telescope Assembly

EIS combines a narrow-angle camera (NAC) and a wide-angle camera (WAC) designed to address the reconnaissance goals. Both cameras operate on the visible spectrum (390 to 700 nm) and make use of push broom scanners for obtaining images with stereoscopic sensors.

The Principal investigator is Elizabeth Turtle.

== Objectives ==
The objectives of the EIS instrument are:

- Characterize the ice shell by determining its thickness and correlating surface features with subsurface structures detected by ice penetrating radar.
- Constrain formation processes of surface features and the potential for current activity by characterizing endogenic structures, surface units, global cross-cutting relationships, and relationships to Europa's subsurface structure, and by searching for evidence of recent activity, including potential plumes.
- Characterize scientifically compelling landing sites and hazards by determining the nature of the surface at scales relevant to a potential Europa Lander.

== General specifications ==
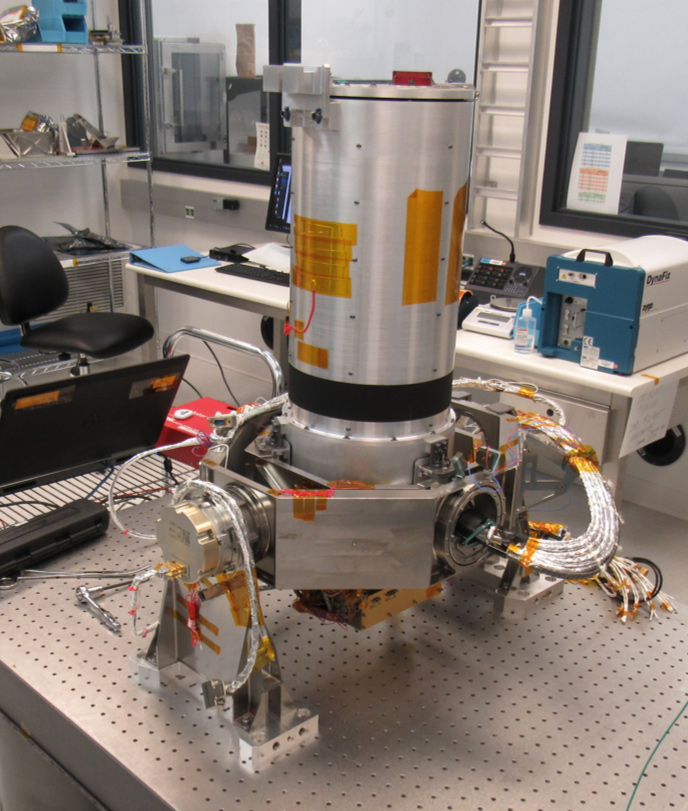
Europa Imaging System Narrow Angle Camera

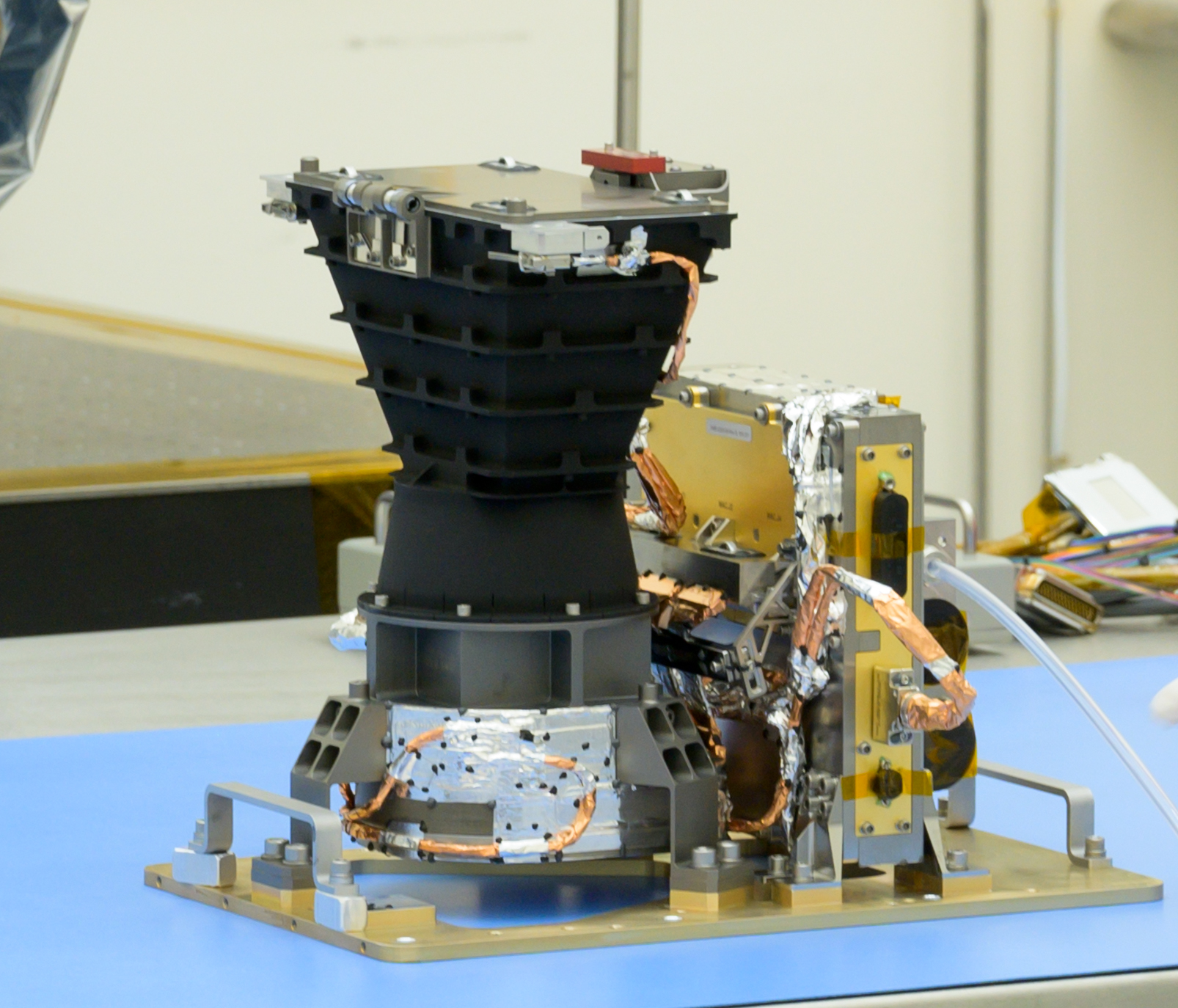
Wide-Angle Camera

Narrow angle camera (NAC)

The NAC provides very high-resolution, stereo reconnaissance, generating 2 km wide swaths at 0.5 m pixel scale from 50 km altitude. NAC observations also include: near-global (>95%) mapping of Europa at ≤50 m pixel scale; regional and high-resolution stereo imaging at <1 m/pixel, and high phase angle observations for plume searches. The NAC will also perform high-phase-angle observations to search for potential plumes, even when the spacecraft is distant from Europa.

Wide angle camera (WAC)

The WAC will acquire stereo reconnaissance, generating digital topographic models with 32 m spatial scale and 4 m vertical precision from 50 km altitude.
