= Elizabeth Turtle =

Planetary scientist (born 1967)

- Born: 1967 (age 58–59)
- Education: Massachusetts Institute of Technology (B.S.); University of Arizona (Ph.D)
- Scientific career
- Fields: Planetary science
- Workplaces: Johns Hopkins University Applied Physics Laboratory; University of Arizona; Planetary Science Institute
- Thesis: Finite-Element Modeling of Large Impact Craters: Implications for the Size of the Vredefort Structure and the Formation of Multiple Ring Craters
- Doctoral advisor: H. Jay Melosh

Elizabeth "Zibi" Turtle is a planetary scientist at the Johns Hopkins University Applied Physics Laboratory.

== Education ==
Elizabeth Turtle grew up in Wellesley, Massachusetts. She went to college at the Massachusetts Institute of Technology and earned her B.S. in physics in 1989. During her undergraduate studies, she was most passionate about the course on planetary science there, and especially robotic exploration. She decided to do her graduate studies in the University of Arizona’s Lunar and Planetary Laboratory and earned her Ph.D. in planetary science from the University of Arizona in 1998.

== Research ==
After earning her Ph.D., Turtle worked at the University of Arizona’s Lunar and Planetary Laboratory and at the Planetary Science Institute in Tucson, Arizona. She joined the Applied Physics Laboratory at Johns Hopkins University in Laurel, Maryland in 2006.

Turtle was an associate of the imaging team on the Galileo mission and an associate of the imaging and RADAR teams on the Cassini mission. She also serves as a co-investigator working with the camera on board the Lunar Reconnaissance Orbiter spacecraft. She has co-authored many scholarly articles about planetary impact features, surface processes, and planetary imaging and mapping.

Turtle is the Principal Investigator on the Europa Imaging System (EIS) instrument, which was selected for inclusion on the Europa Clipper to the moon Europa. She is also the principal investigator of the Dragonfly rotorcraft, a mission proposal to the 2017 NASA New Frontiers mission solicitation, which was selected on 27 June 2019. The mission entails a relocatable dual-quadcopter lander to investigate the surface composition and meteorology of Titan.

== Publications and talks ==
In 2020, Turtle gave a Ted Talk on Titan, titled What Saturn's most mysterious moon could teach us about the origins of life.

Turtle is the primary author on dozens of scientific publications and co-author on many more. Below is a selection of some of her most cited articles, published as a first author:

- Turtle, E. P., Pierazzo, E. (2001), "Thickness of a Europan Ice Shell from Impact Crater Simulations". Science 294, 1326-1328. DOI:10.1126/science.1062492
- Turtle, E. P. et al. (2009), "Cassini imaging of Titan's high-latitude lakes, clouds, and south-polar surface changes". Geophysical Research Letters, 36, L02204, doi:10.1029/2008GL036186.
- Turtle, E. P. et al. (2011), "Rapid and Extensive Surface Changes Near Titan’s Equator: Evidence of April Showers". Science 331, 1414-1417. DOI:10.1126/science.1201063

== Awards ==
2008, 2009, 2010, 2015: NASA Group Achievement Awards - Cassini Titan Integration Science Team, Cassini Imaging Science Team, Cassini Titan Orbiter Science Team, Lunar Reconnaissance Orbiter (LRO) Team, LRO Extended Science Mission Team

2021: Claudia J. Alexander Prize, for outstanding contributions by a mid-career scientist.

== See also ==
- List of women in leadership positions on astronomical instrumentation projects
