= Mass Spectrometer for Planetary Exploration =

Europan atmosphere sampler aboard NASA's Clipper

MASPEX
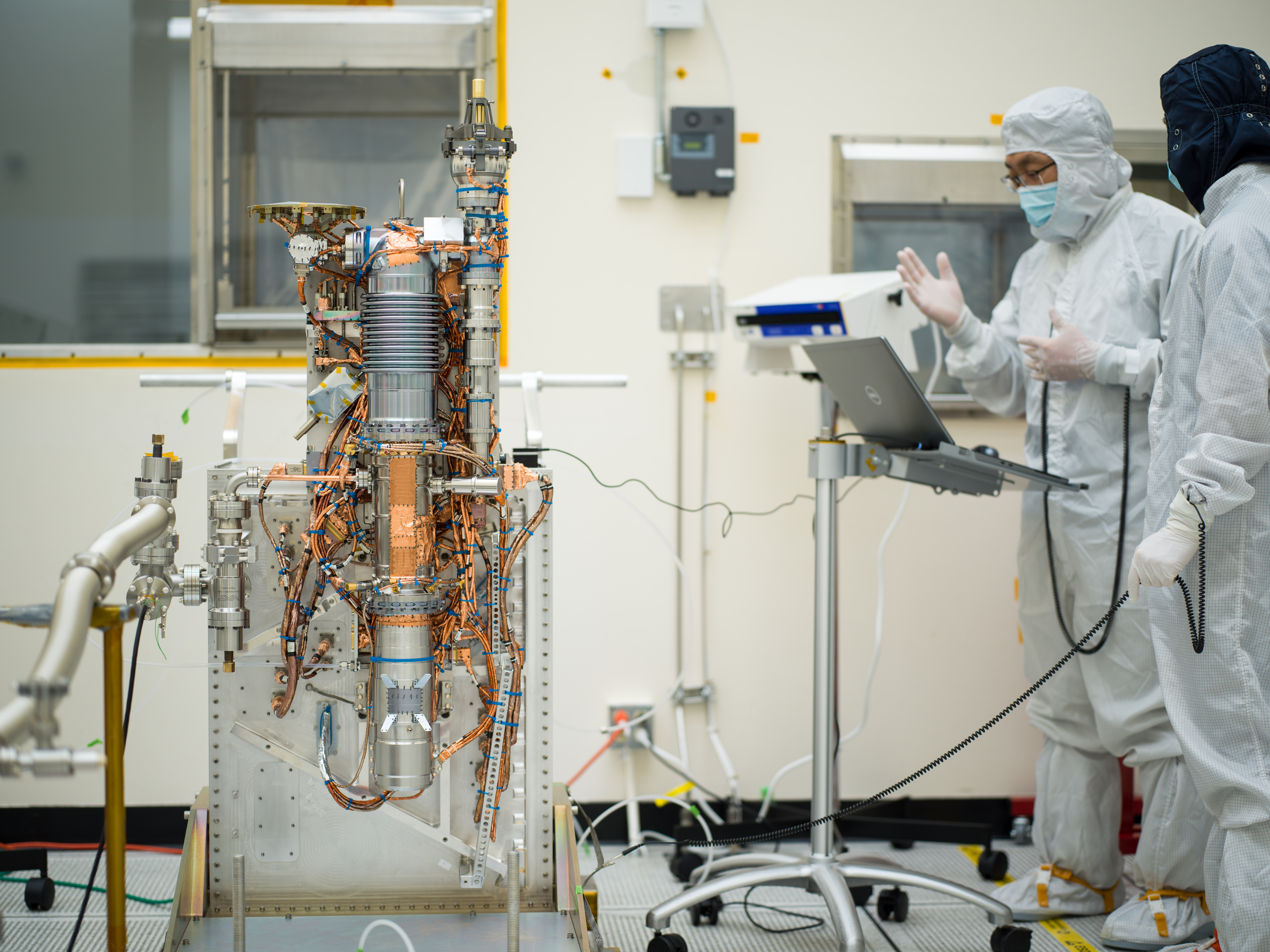
- Operator: NASA
- Manufacturer: Southwest Research Institute
- Instrument type: mass spectrometer
- Function: chemical analyzer
- Mission duration: Cruise: 3-6 years Science phase: ≥ 3 years

Properties
- Resolution: 1 ppt

Host spacecraft
- Spacecraft: Europa Clipper
- Operator: NASA
- Launch date: October 14, 2024, 16:06:00 UTC (12:06 p.m. EDT)
- Rocket: Falcon Heavy Block 5
- Launch site: Kennedy Space Center

The MAss Spectrometer for Planetary EXploration (MASPEX) is a time-of-flight mass spectrometer capable of high-resolution and high-sensitivity that allows the determination of a wide variety of chemical compounds in complex mixtures. This instrument will fly on board the planned Europa Clipper orbiter to explore Jupiter's moon Europa. This astrobiology mission will analyse the composition of Europa's surface while in orbit, and will directly assess its internal ocean habitability by flying through Europa's tenuous atmosphere.

On 27 May 2016 it was announced that MASPEX was selected to fly on the mission. The instrument has also been proposed to fly on three Discovery program missions: Enceladus Life Finder (ELF), comet Hartley 2 (PRIME), and to the main belt comet Read (Proteus). It also has applications for probes, landers, and sample return missions. The original Principal Investigator was Jack Waite, and the Technical Lead is Tim Brockwell, from the Southwest Research Institute. In 2020 NASA announced that Jim Burch of Southwest Research Institute would become the Principal Investigator and that some instrument capabilities might be reduced due to technical and financial limitations.

== Overview ==
MASPEX is a next generation spectrometer with significantly improved performance over existing instruments, that was developed over 10 years by the Southwest Research Institute. Development of the MASPEX was born out of the need to separate and analyze the unexpectedly rich volatile mixtures discovered by the Cassini INMS instrument at Titan and Enceladus. The instrument is a high-resolution, high-sensitivity mass spectrometer developed for planetary applications. Its high-resolution allows the unambiguous determination of volatile isotopes of methane, water, ammonia, carbon monoxide, molecular nitrogen (N_{2}), carbon dioxide (CO_{2}), and small organic compounds (C2, C3, and C4) in complex mixtures. MASPEX can also measure compounds in trace amounts (ppt), including the noble gases argon, krypton, xenon, and their isotopes.

The MASPEX can operate in a heavy radiation environment, and can be baked to 300 °C for planetary protection against forward biological contamination in case the probe impacts any potentially habitable moon of Jupiter. Other areas of enhanced performance over existing instruments include:

| Parameter | Performance |
|---|---|
| Extended mass range for heavy organic molecules | >1000 Da |
| Enhanced mass resolution | >30000 M/dM |
| Enhanced dynamic range | 109 in a 1 s period |
| Improved sensitivity | better than 1ppt with cryotrapping |
| High throughput | >5000 samples/s |
| Length and mass | 40 cm and < 8 kg |

== See also ==
- Abiogenesis
- Astrobiology
- Cosmochemistry
- Europa Lander (NASA)
