= Plasma Instrument for Magnetic Sounding =

Faraday cup instrument for Europa Clipper

- Faraday cup sensors and instrument housings in two configurations. On the left is the final flight hardware, with insulating thermal blankets installed; on the right is a test configuration that protects sensitive hardware for transportation.
- Operator: NASA
- Manufacturer: JHU/APL
- Function: Plasma Sensor
- Mission duration: Cruise: 3-6 years Science phase: ≥ 3 years

Host spacecraft
- Spacecraft: Europa Clipper
- Operator: NASA
- Launch date: October 14, 2024, 16:06:00 UTC (12:06 p.m. EDT)
- Rocket: SLS
- Launch site: Kennedy Space Center

The Plasma Instrument for Magnetic Sounding (PIMS) is a Faraday cup based instrument that will fly on board the Europa Clipper orbiter to explore Jupiter's moon Europa. PIMS will measure the plasma that populates Jupiter's magnetosphere and Europa's ionosphere.

The principal investigator is Dr. Adrienn Luspay-Kuti, from the Johns Hopkins University Applied Physics Laboratory (APL).

== Overview ==
The plasma in Jupiter's magnetosphere interacts with Europa's atmosphere. This interaction results in magnetic field perturbations. While understanding this plasma interaction is inherently interesting, it is also crucial for successful magnetic sounding Europa's subsurface ocean. The interaction of the Jovian magnetic field with Europa's subsurface ocean produces a magnetic induction signature that is used to determine the ice shell thickness, ocean depth, and ocean salinity of Europa's subsurface ocean. Separating the sources of magnetic field perturbations produces a better understanding of the ocean's properties.

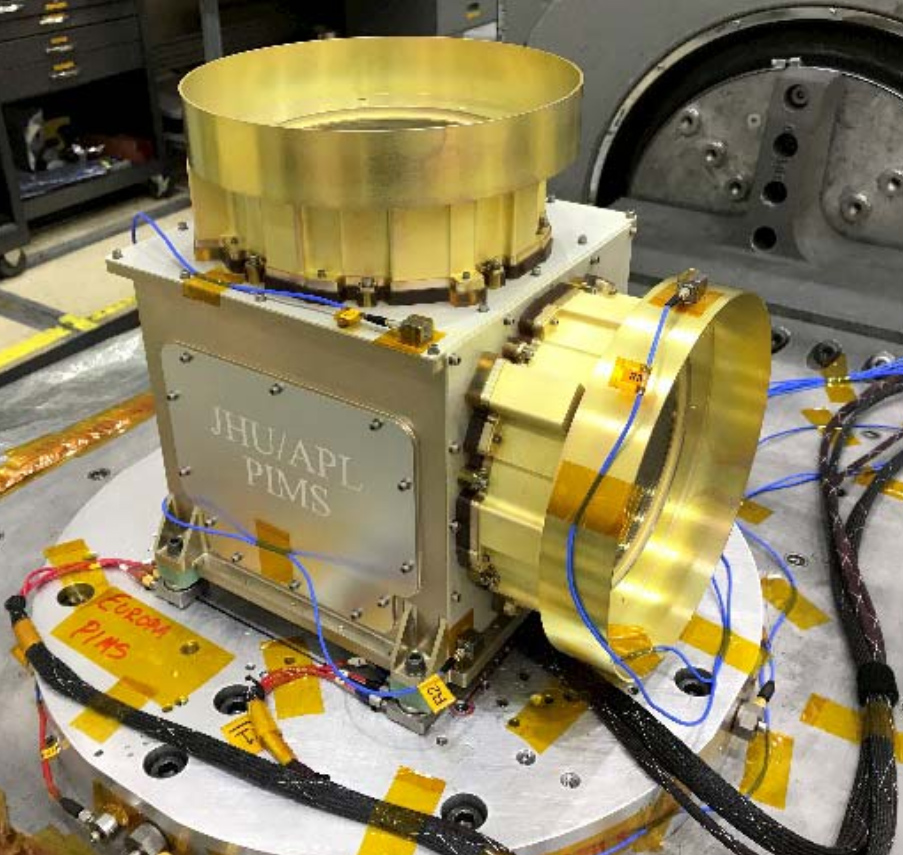
The Plasma Instrument for Magnetic Sounding during development.

The Plasma Instrument for Magnetic Sounding (PIMS) is a Faraday cup-based instrument that will measure the plasma of Jupiter's magnetosphere and Europa's ionosphere. Such devices on spacecraft date back to Explorer 10 in 1961 and were used by the Voyager 1 spacecraft to study Jupiter's magnetosphere in 1979.

== Science goals ==
The three science goals of PIMS investigation are:

- study how Europa influences its magnetosphere, and Jupiter's magnetosphere.
- study the mechanisms for weathering and releasing material from Europa's surface into the atmosphere and ionosphere.
- constrain the inner ocean's salinity and depth.

=== Principle ===
In magnetic sounding, currents induced in Europa by the changing Jovian plasma produce a detectable secondary magnetic field that reflects properties of Europa's subsurface ocean such as depth and conductivity. PIMS is composed of three Faraday cups, each with a 90º field of view. The cups measure the current produced on metal collector plates by charged particles with sufficient energy per charge (E/q) to pass through a modulated retarding grid placed at variable high voltage.

In the Jovian magnetospheric plasma PIMS measures the density and flow velocity of ions with energies below 7 keV, and the density and energy of electrons with energies below 2 keV. In Europa's ionosphere (and in transitional plasmas, such as plumes) PIMS measures the density and temperature of ions and electrons. The PIMS investigation can also help in the search for active plumes and measure their mass-loading, by measuring the magnetic perturbations of Europa's ionosphere.

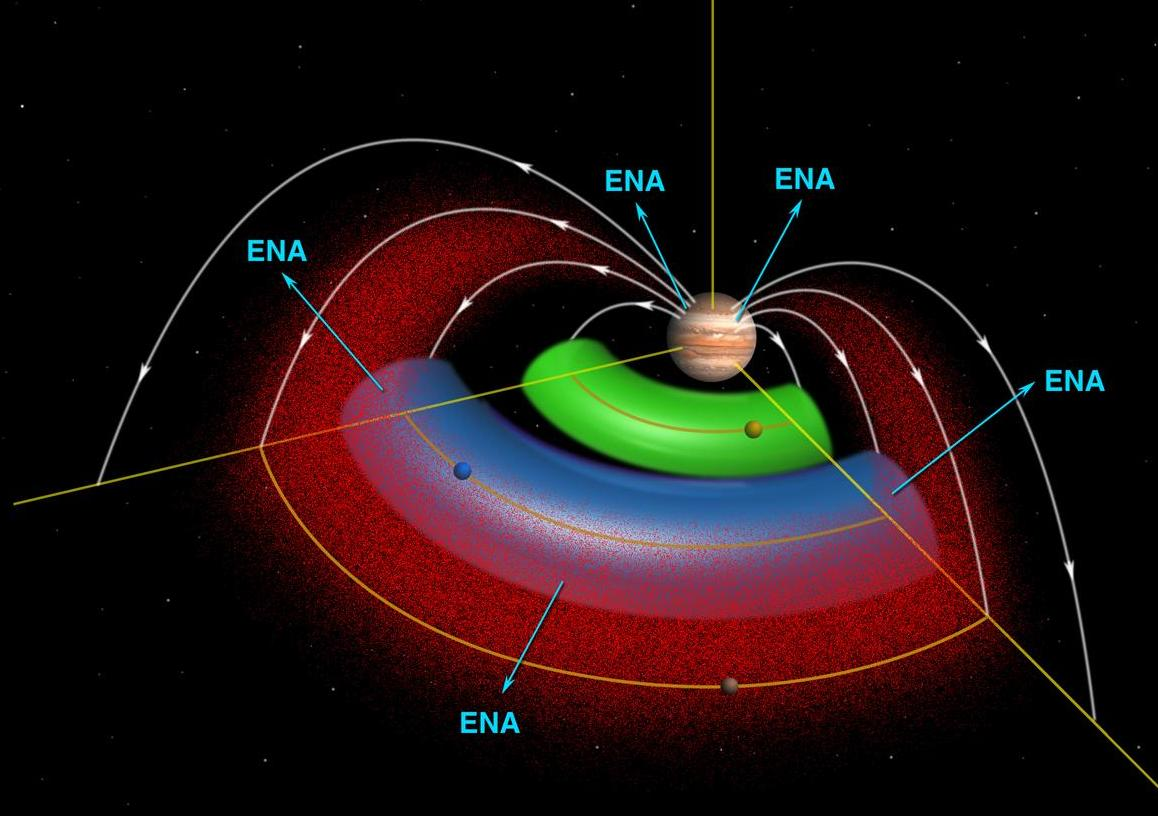
Plasma tori created by Io and Europa

Image of Jupiter's northern aurorae, showing the main auroral oval, the polar emissions, and the spots generated by the interaction with Jupiter's natural satellites

PIMS works in synergy with the Interior Characterization of Europa using Magnetometry (ICEMAG) instrument to probe Europa's subsurface ocean.

Parameter	Performance
In Magnetospheric Mode	•Electron energy: 10 eV – 2 keV •Ion energy: 20 eV – 6 keV
In Ionospheric Mode	•Electron energy: 1 – 50 eV •Ion energy: 1 – 50 eV
Energy resolution	10% ΔE/E
Sensitivity	0.5 pA/cm^{2} – 1×10^{5} pA/cm^{2}
Field of view	4 × 90° cone
Temporal resolution	1 second for a full ion and electron sweep in Ionospheric Mode 4 seconds for a full ion and electron sweep in Magnetospheric Mode 5 seconds for a full ion and electron sweep in Transition Mode

== See also ==
- Plasma Wave Subsystem (PWS, on Voyager 1 & 2 previously used to observe Jovian magnetosphere)
