= Mapping Imaging Spectrometer for Europa =

Near infrared spectrometer

MISE
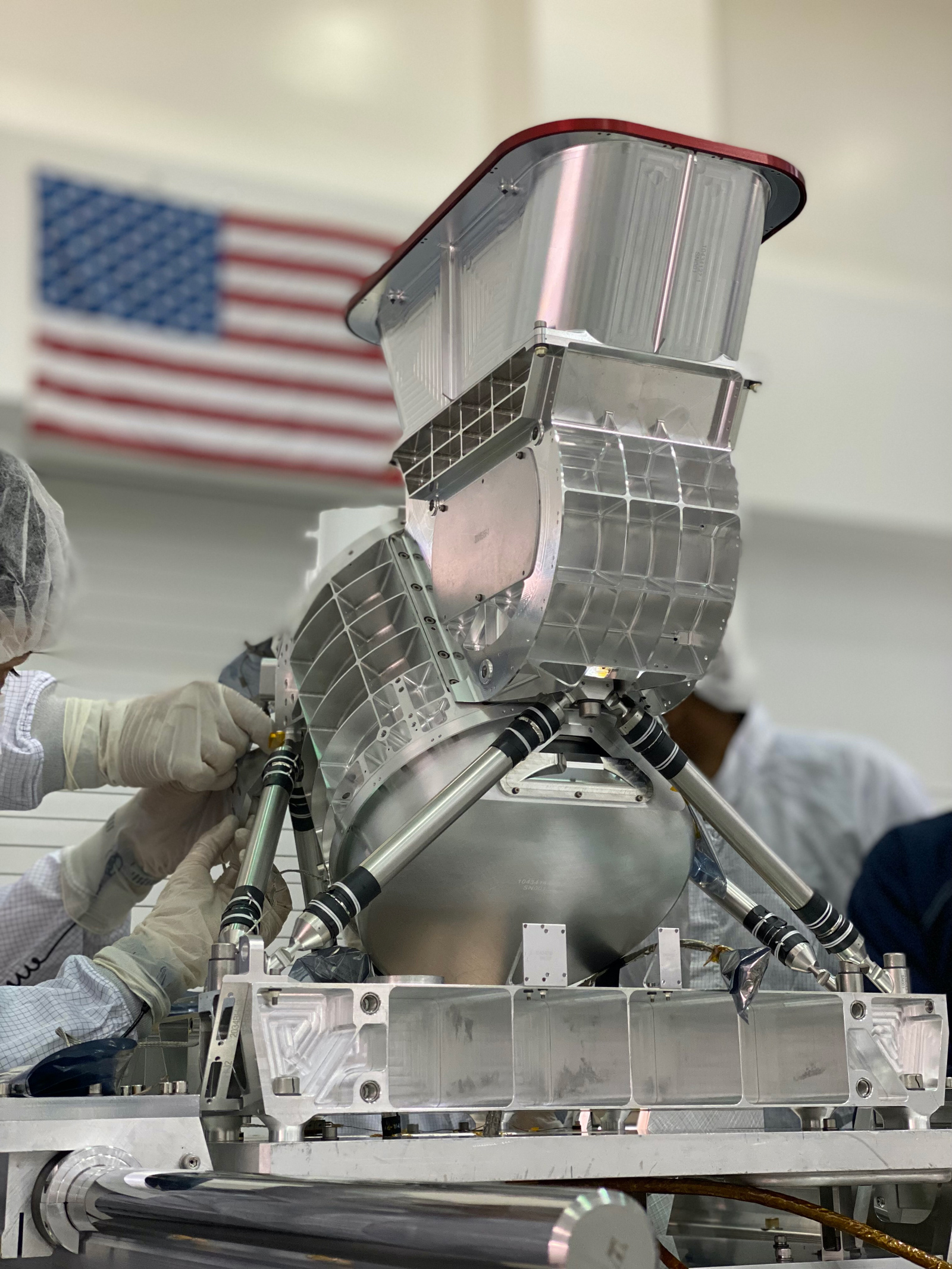
- Operator: NASA
- Manufacturer: JPL and APL
- Instrument type: Near infrared spectrometer
- Function: Mapper
- Mission duration: Cruise: 3-6 years Science phase: ≥ 3 years

Properties
- Spectral band: Near infrared

Host spacecraft
- Spacecraft: Europa Clipper
- Operator: NASA
- Launch date: October 14, 2024, 16:06:00 UTC (12:06 p.m. EDT)
- Rocket: SLS
- Launch site: Kennedy Space Center

The Mapping Imaging Spectrometer for Europa (MISE) is an imaging near infrared spectrometer on board the Europa Clipper mission to Jupiter's moon Europa. MISE will examine Europa's surface composition and relate it to the habitability of its internal water ocean.

== Overview ==
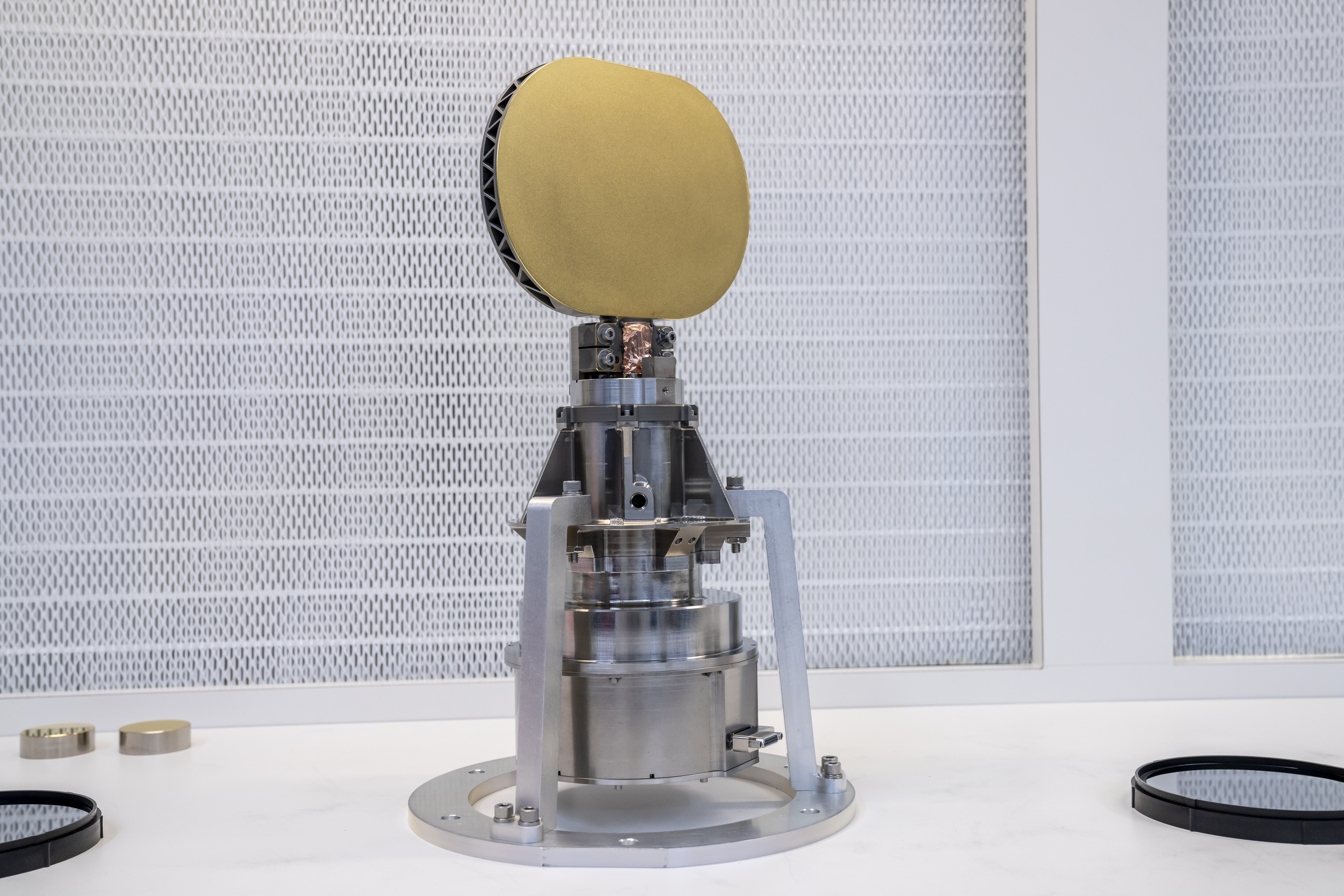
Imaging Spectrometer's Scanning Mirror and Data Processing Unit

Since NASA's Voyager mission flew past Europa in 1979, scientists have worked to understand the composition of the reddish-brown material known as tholin that coats fractures and other geologically youthful features on Europa's surface. Material from the ocean is probably being transported to the surface by active processes in the interior. At the surface, the material is exposed to the effects of vacuum, temperature, irradiated by solar UV, and bombarded by material entrained in Jupiter's magnetic field, causing photolysis and radiolysis and the transformation and generation of new organic compounds. The compounds at the surface are likely recycled back into the ocean below. Visible to Short Wavelength Infrared (VSWIR) spectroscopy is a well-understood technique for mapping from orbit key inorganic, organic, and volatile compositions on planetary surfaces.

MISE was selected for the Europa Clipper mission in May 2015, and it is built by the JPL in collaboration with the Johns Hopkins University Applied Physics Laboratory (APL). The instrument's Principal Investigator is Diana Blaney.

== Goal ==
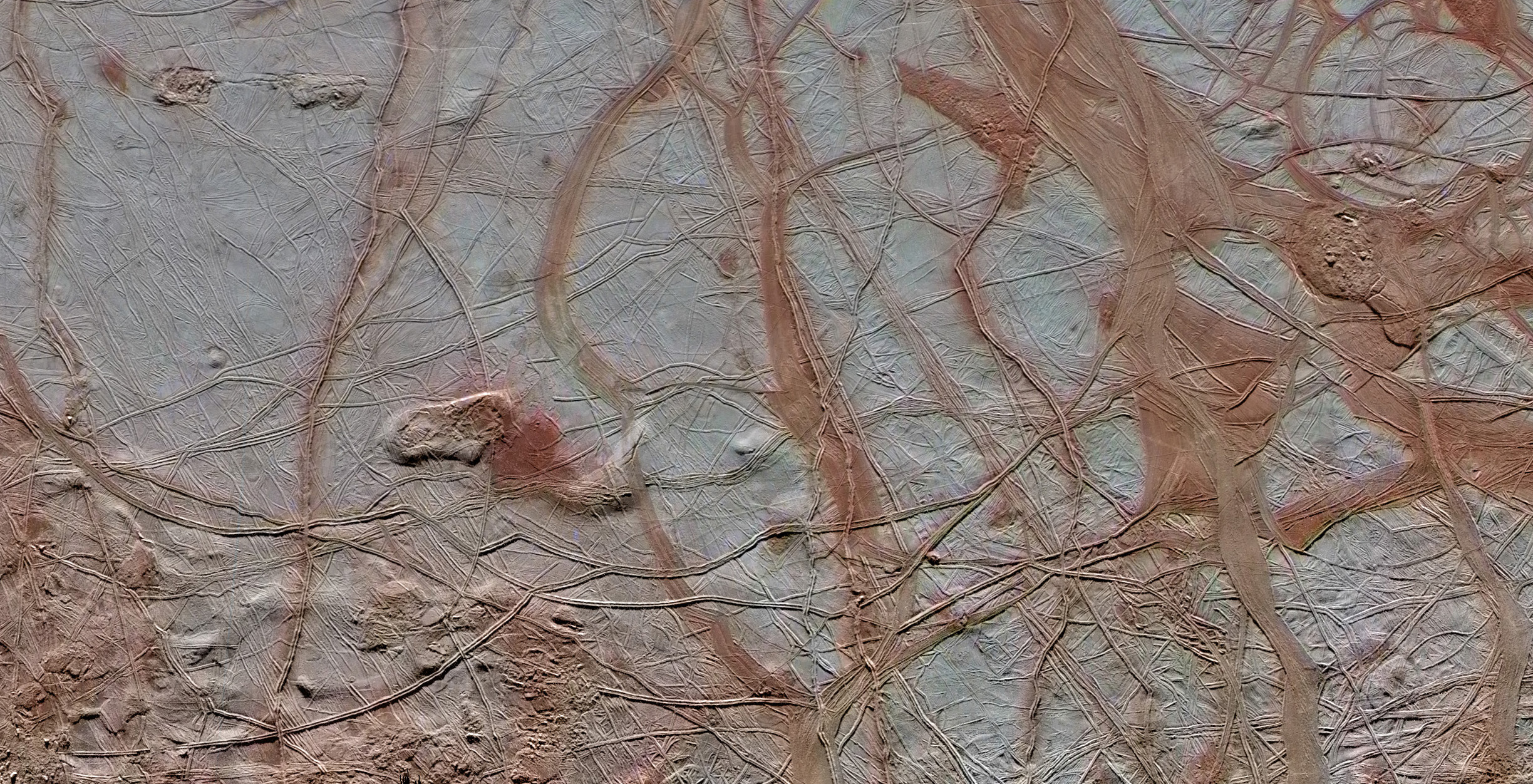
Intricate pattern of linear fractures on Europa's surface, likely colored by tholins, which are a wide mix of complex organic compounds

A primary goal of the MISE instrument is to determine if Europa is capable of supporting life by searching for amino acid signatures in the infrared spectra. MISE can distinguish between different types of amino acids, such as isoleucine, leucine, and their enantiomers.

The MISE spectrometer is designed to enable the identification and mapping of organics, salts, acid hydrates, water ice phases, altered silicates, and radiolytic compounds at global (≤ 10 km), regional (≤ 300 m), and local scales (~ 25 m). Distribution maps of astrobiologically relevant compounds and evaluating geological processes can be used to determine if Europa's ocean possesses the chemical energy necessary to support life. MISE could provide fundamental information on where future Europa landers would have the highest probability of detecting organic biosignatures.

== Description ==
The MISE design is an imaging infrared spectrometer that could observe effectively throughout a flyby or in orbit around Europa. It is designed to operate within Europa's harsh radiation environment. MISE would cover a spectral range from 0.8 μm to 5 μm (near infrared to mid-infrared), with an instantaneous field of view of 250 μrad/pixel and a swath width of 300 active pixels. The 0.8–2.5 μm region is essential for quantifying hydrates and bulk surface composition, while the 3–5 μm spectral region is required for detecting low abundances of organics, most radiolytic products, and discriminating salts from acid hydrates. Large organic molecules such as tholins have spectral features at 4.57 μm and 3.4 μm. These longer wavelengths can also be used to measure thermal emissions from currently active regions.

The prototype also underwent a planetary protection bakeout to ensure that the design was compatible with dry heat microbial sterilization.

== See also ==
- Abiogenesis
- Astrobiology
- Cosmochemistry
- Europa Lander (NASA)
- Jovian Infrared Auroral Mapper (Infrared imaging spectrometer used at Jupiter)
