= Radar for Europa Assessment and Sounding: Ocean to Near-surface =

Ice-penetrating radar for Europa Clipper

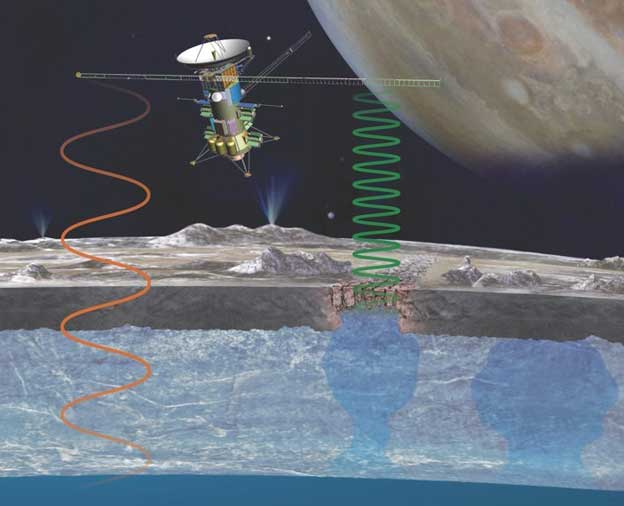
- Artist's impression of the Europa Clipper's REASON instrument in action, using dual-frequency radar to map Europa's ice layer
- Operator: NASA
- Manufacturer: Jackson School of Geosciences and JPL
- Instrument type: Ice penetrating radar
- Function: Characterize ice shell structure
- Mission duration: Cruise: 5.5 years Science phase: 4 years

Properties
- Mass: 32.2 kg
- Dimensions: Antenna: 16 m (52 ft)
- Power consumption: 55 W
- Data rate: 5 - 80 Mbps

Host spacecraft
- Spacecraft: Europa Clipper
- Operator: NASA
- Launch date: October 14, 2024, 16:06:00 UTC (12:06 p.m. EDT)
- Rocket: Falcon Heavy
- Launch site: Kennedy Space Center

The Radar for Europa Assessment and Sounding: Ocean to Near-surface (REASON) is a multi-frequency, multi-channel ice penetrating radar system that will be flown on board the Europa Clipper mission to Jupiter's moon Europa. REASON investigation will provide the first direct measurements of Europa's ice shell surface character and subsurface structure.

== Overview ==
REASON deployment

The REASON instrument makes innovative use of radar sounding, altimetry, reflectometry, plasma and particles analyses. These investigations will use a dual-frequency radar emitting HF (9 MHz) and VHF (60 MHz) with concurrent shallow and deep sounding. Both VHF and HF radiating elements are mounted on a single boom, reducing antenna mass. The mission plan also includes using REASON as a nadir altimeter capable of measuring tides to test ice shell and ocean hypotheses as well as characterizing roughness across the surface to identify potential landing sites for a future Europa Lander.

The REASON instrument will also be able to spot pockets of water within the ice shell that could serve as a passageway for chemicals on the moon's surface to the ocean below — an environment where life could potentially develop.

The instrument was developed by the Jackson School of Geosciences, and its Principal Investigator is Donald Blankenship. REASON was fabricated by engineers from NASA's Jet Propulsion Laboratory and the University of Iowa.

== Specifications table ==
REASON	Units/performance
Electronics mass	17.5 kg
Antenna mass	14.7 kg
Total mass	32.2 kg
Operating power	55 W
Antenna length	16 m (52 ft)
VHF (shallow sounding)	300 m to 4.5 km
HF (deep sounding)	1 km to 30 km
Pulse length	30 - 100 μs
Operational altitude	10 - 1000 km
Radar potential	HF: 63 dB; VHF: 72 dB
Data rate	5 - 80 Mbps
Data volume per flyby	24 Gbits

== Objectives ==
The scientific objectives of the REASON investigation are:

- Characterize the distribution of any shallow subsurface water
- Search for an ice-ocean interface and characterize the ice shell's global structure
- Investigate the processes governing material exchange among the ocean, ice shell, surface, and atmosphere
- Constrain the amplitude and phase of gravitational tides
- Characterize scientifically compelling sites, and hazards, for a potential future Europa Lander mission
