= Fields =

Fields may refer to:

== Music ==
- Fields (band), an indie rock band formed in 2006
- Fields (progressive rock band), a progressive rock band formed in 1971
- Fields (album), an LP by Swedish-based indie rock band Junip (2010)
- "Fields", a song by Sponge from Rotting Piñata (1994)

== Businesses ==
- Field's, a shopping centre in Denmark
- Fields (department store), a chain of discount department stores in Alberta and British Columbia, Canada

== Places in the United States ==
- Fields, Louisiana, an unincorporated community
- Fields, Oregon, an unincorporated community
- Fields (Frisco, Texas), an announced planned community
- Fields Landing, California, a CDP

== Other uses ==
- Fields (surname), a list of people with that name
- Fields Avenue (disambiguation), various roads
- Fields Institute, a research centre in mathematical sciences at the University of Toronto
- Fields Medal, for outstanding achievement in mathematics
- Caulfield Grammarians Football Club, also known as The Fields
- FIELDS, a spacecraft instrument on the Parker Solar Probe

== See also ==
- Mrs. Fields, an American franchisor in the food industry
- Marshall Field's, a former department store chain in Illinois, United States
- Field (disambiguation)
- The Fields (disambiguation)
