= Mariner 1 =

Failed NASA mission to Venus (1962)

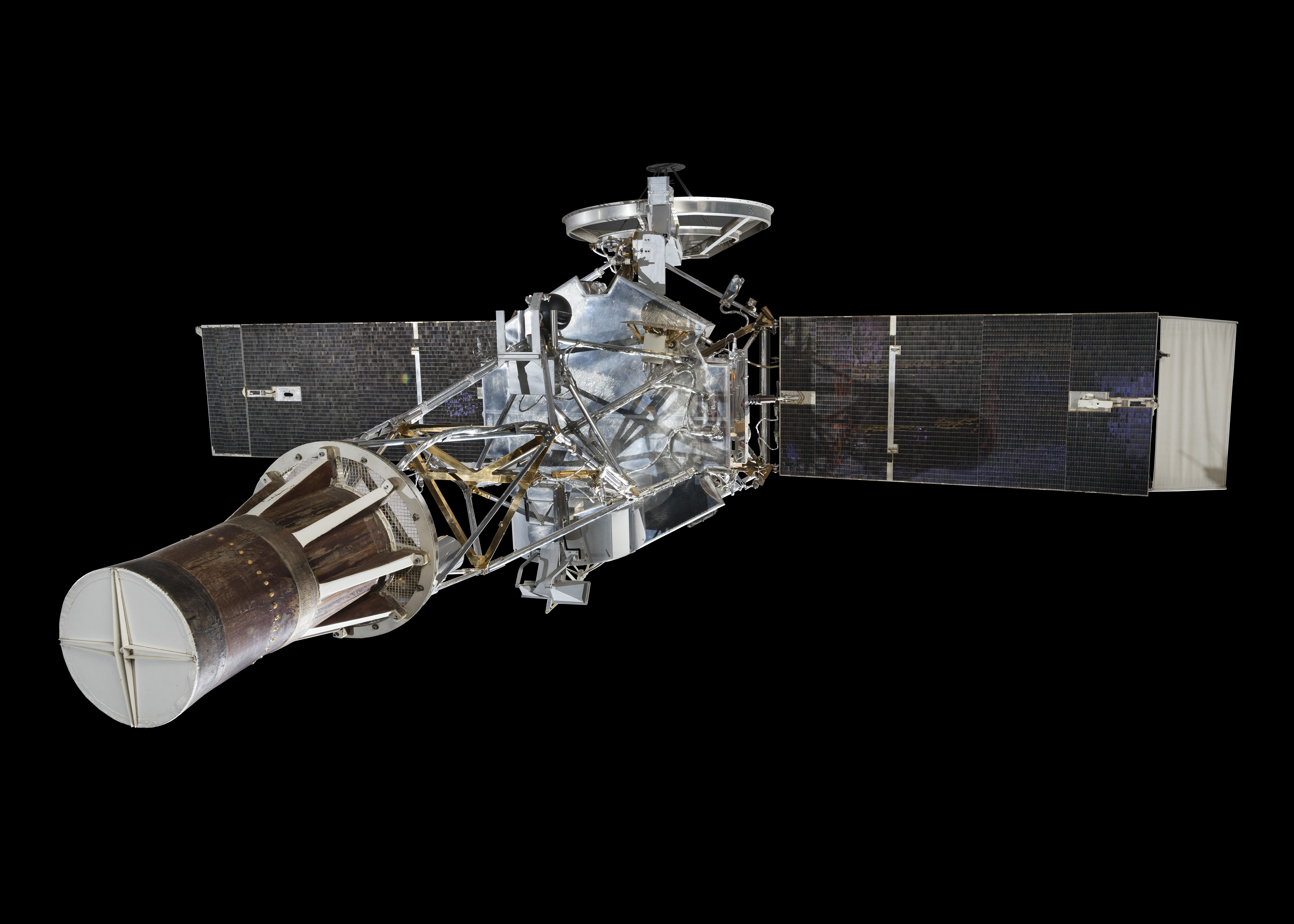
- A model of Mariner 2, showing its design that is identical with Mariner 1
- Mission type: Venus flyby
- Operator: NASA / JPL
- Mission duration: 4 minutes and 54 seconds Failed to orbit

Spacecraft properties
- Spacecraft type: Ranger Block I
- Manufacturer: Jet Propulsion Laboratory
- Launch mass: 202.8 kilograms (447 lb)

Start of mission
- Launch date: July 22, 1962, 09:21:23 GMT
- Rocket: Atlas LV-3 Agena-B
- Launch site: Cape Canaveral, LC-12

End of mission
- Disposal: Launch failure
- Destroyed: July 22, 1962, 09:26:17.5 GMT

Mariner 1 was the first spacecraft of NASA's interplanetary Mariner program, built to conduct the first American planetary flyby of Venus. Developed by Jet Propulsion Laboratory and originally planned to be a purpose-built probe launched summer 1962, Mariner 1's design was changed when the Centaur proved unavailable at that early date. Mariner 1 and its sibling spacecraft Mariner 2 were then adapted from the lighter Ranger lunar spacecraft. Mariner 1 carried a suite of experiments to determine the temperature of Venus as well to measure magnetic fields and charged particles near the planet and in interplanetary space.

Mariner 1 was launched by an Atlas-Agena rocket from Cape Canaveral's Pad 12 on July 22, 1962. Shortly after liftoff, errors in communication between the rocket and its ground-based guidance systems caused the rocket to veer off course, and it had to be destroyed by range safety. The errors were traced to a mistake in a specification of the hand-written guidance equations which were then subsequently codified in the computer program.

== Background ==
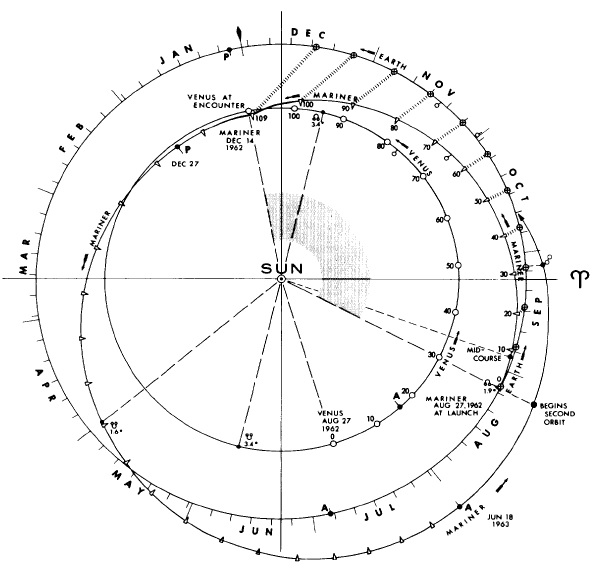
Mariner II trajectory projected on the ecliptic plane.

With the advent of the Cold War, the two then-superpowers, the United States and the Soviet Union, both initiated ambitious space programs with the intent of demonstrating military, technological, and political dominance. The Soviets launched Sputnik 1, the first Earth-orbiting satellite, on October 4, 1957. The Americans followed suit with Explorer 1 on February 1, 1958, by which point the Soviets had launched the first orbiting animal, Laika in Sputnik 2. Earth's orbit having been reached, focus turned to being the first to the Moon. The Pioneer program of satellites consisted of three unsuccessful lunar attempts in 1958. In early 1959, the Soviet Luna 1 was the first probe to fly by the Moon, followed by Luna 2, the first artificial object to impact the Moon.

After contacting the Moon, the superpowers turned their focus to the planets. As the closest planet to Earth, Venus presented an appealing interplanetary spaceflight target. Every 19 months, Venus and the Earth reach relative positions in their orbits around the Sun such that a minimum of fuel is required to travel from one planet to the other. These opportunities mark the optimal time to launch exploratory spacecraft, using a path called the Hohmann transfer orbit.

The first such opportunity of the space race occurred in late 1957, before either superpower had the technology to take advantage of it. The second opportunity, around June 1959, lay just within the edge of technological feasibility, and U.S. Air Force contractor Space Technology Laboratory (STL) intended to take advantage of it. A plan drafted January 1959 involved two spacecraft evolved from the first Pioneer probes, one to be launched via Thor-Able rocket, the other via the yet-untested Atlas-Able. STL was unable to complete the probes before June, and the launch window was missed. The Thor-Able probe was repurposed as the deep space explorer Pioneer 5, which was launched March 11, 1960, and designed to maintain communications with Earth up to a distance of 20,000,000 mi (32,000,000 km) as it traveled toward the orbit of Venus. (The Atlas Able probe concept was repurposed as the unsuccessful Pioneer Atlas Moon probes.) No American missions were sent during the early 1961 opportunity. The Soviet Union launched Venera 1 on February 12, 1961, and on May 19–20 it became the first probe to fly by Venus; however, it had stopped transmitting on February 26.

For the summer 1962 launch opportunity, NASA contracted Jet Propulsion Laboratory (JPL) in July 1960 to develop "Mariner A", a 1,250 lb (570 kg) spacecraft to be launched using the yet undeveloped Atlas-Centaur vehicle. By August 1961, it had become clear that the Centaur would not be ready in time. JPL proposed to NASA that the mission might be accomplished with a lighter spacecraft using the less powerful but operational Atlas-Agena. A hybrid of Mariner A and JPL's Block 1 Ranger lunar explorer, already under development, was suggested. NASA accepted the proposal, and JPL began an 11-month crash program to develop "Mariner R" (so named because it was a Ranger derivative). Mariner 1 was the first Mariner R to be launched.

== Spacecraft ==
Three Mariner R spacecraft were built: two for launching and one to run tests, which was also to be used as a spare. Aside from its scientific capabilities, Mariner also had to transmit data back to Earth from a distance of more than 26,000,000 mi (42,000,000 km), and to survive solar radiation twice as intense as that encountered in Earth orbit.

=== Structure ===
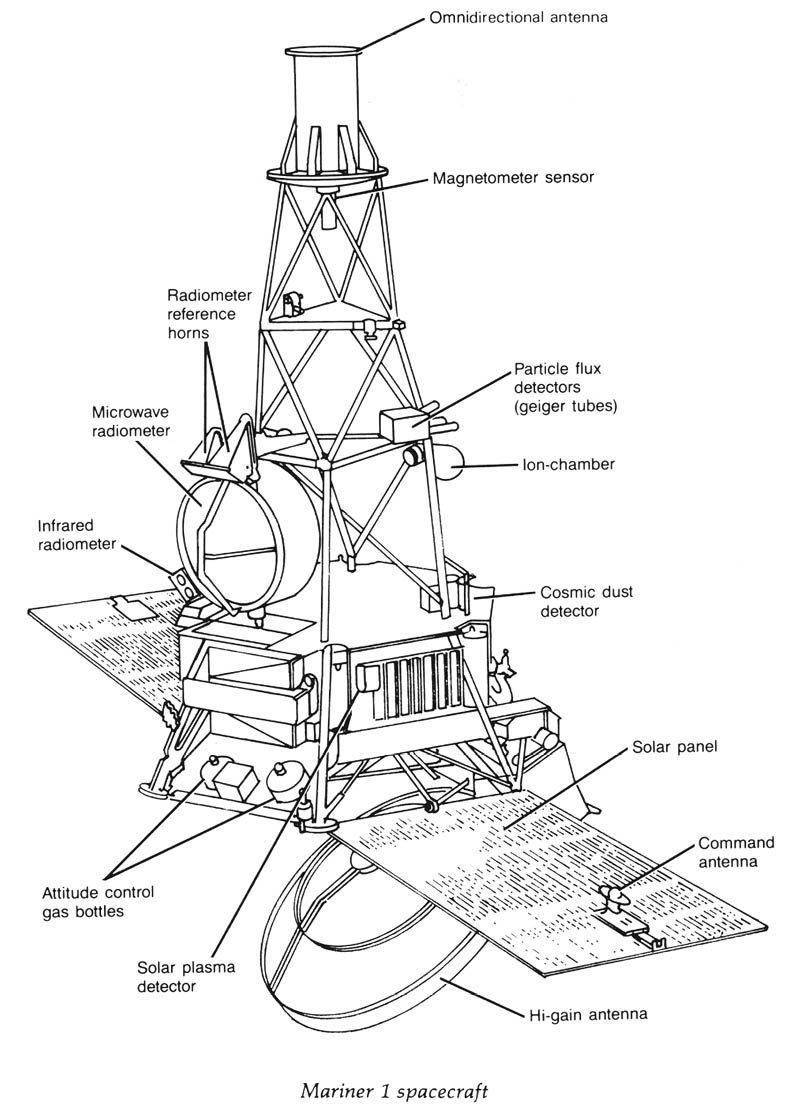
Diagram of Mariner 1

All three of the Mariner R spacecraft, including Mariner 1, weighed within 3 lb (1.4 kg) of the design weight of 447 lb (203 kg), 406 lb (184 kg) of which was devoted to non-experimental systems: maneuvering systems, fuel, and communications equipment for receiving commands and transmitting data. Once fully deployed in space, with its two solar panel "wings" extended, Mariner R was 12 ft (3.7 m) in height and 16.5 ft (5.0 m) across. The main body of the craft was hexagonal with six separate cases of electronic and electromechanical equipment:

- Two of the cases comprised the power system: switchgear that regulated and transmitted power from the 9800 solar cells to the 33.3 lb (15.1 kg) rechargeable 1000 watt silver-zinc storage battery.
- Two more included the radio receiver, the three-watt transmitter, and control systems for Mariner's experiments.
- The fifth case held electronics for digitizing the analog data received by the experiments for transmission.
- The sixth case carried the three gyroscopes that determined Mariner's orientation in space. It also held the central computer and sequencer, the "brain" of the spacecraft that coordinated all of its activities pursuant to code in its memory banks and on a schedule maintained by an electronic clock tuned into equipment on Earth.

At the rear of the spacecraft, a monopropellant (anhydrous hydrazine) 225 N rocket motor was mounted for course corrections. A nitrogen gas fueled stabilizing system of ten jet nozzles controlled by the onboard gyroscopes, Sun sensors, and Earth sensors, kept Mariner properly oriented to receive and transmit data to Earth.

The primary high gain parabolic antenna was also mounted on the underside of Mariner and kept pointed toward the Earth. An omnidirectional antenna atop the spacecraft would broadcast at times that the spacecraft was rolling or tumbling out of its proper orientation, to maintain contact with Earth; as an unfocused antenna, its signal would be much weaker than the primary. Mariner also mounted small antennas on each of the wings to receive commands from ground stations.

Temperature control was both passive, involving insulated and highly reflective components, and active, incorporating louvers to protect the case carrying the onboard computer. At the time the first Mariners were built, no environmental chamber existed to simulate the near-Venus solar environment, so the efficacy of these cooling techniques could not be tested until the live mission.

=== Scientific package ===
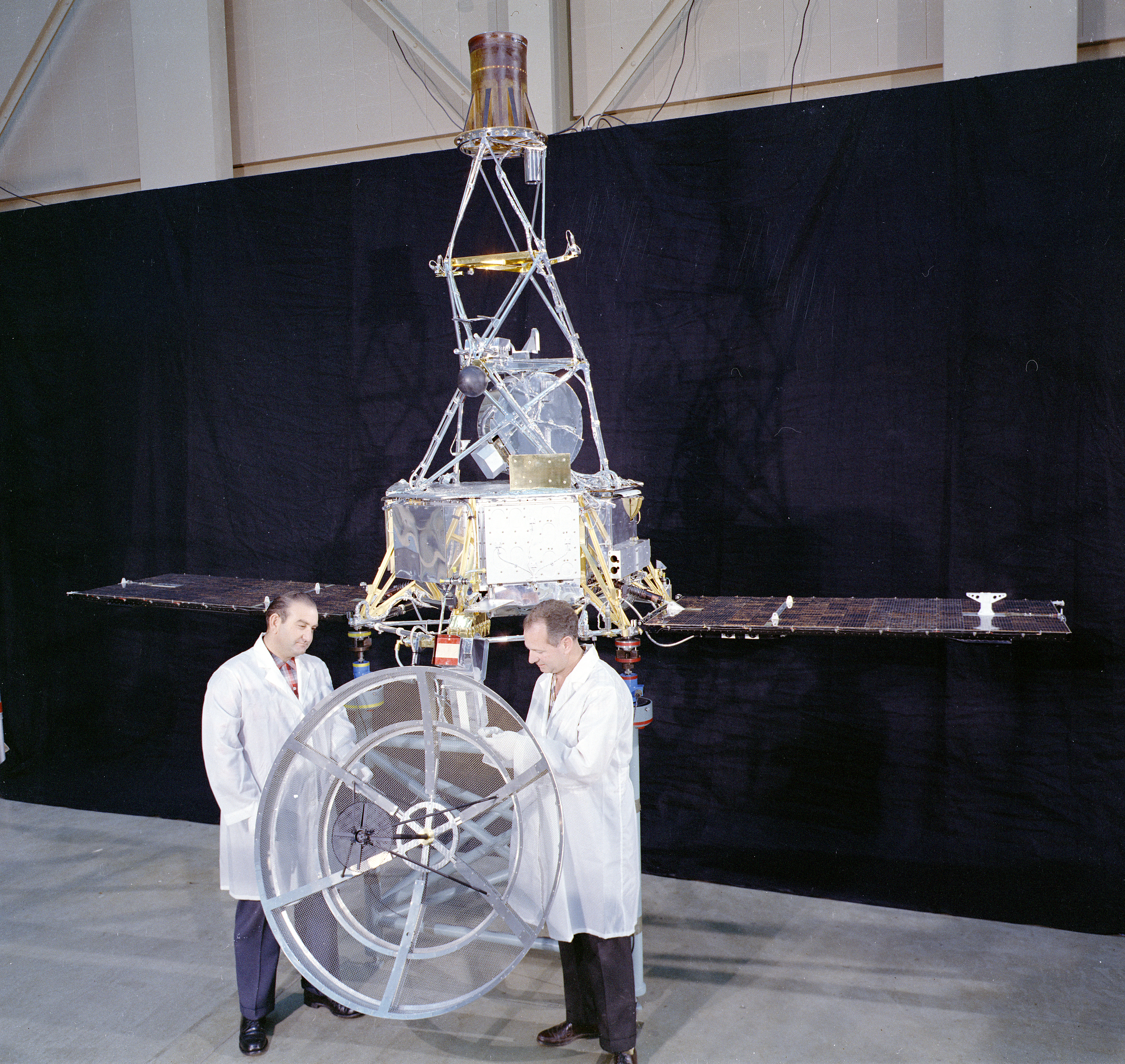
Mariner 1 in JPL's Spacecraft Assembly Facility

==== Background ====
At the time of the Mariner project's inception, few of Venus's characteristics were definitely known. Its opaque atmosphere precluded telescopic study of the ground. It was unknown whether there was water beneath the clouds, though a small amount of water vapor above them had been detected. The planet's rotation rate was uncertain, though JPL scientists had concluded through radar observation that Venus rotated very slowly compared to the Earth, advancing the long-standing (but eventually disproven) hypothesis that the planet was tidally locked with respect to the Sun like the Moon is with respect to the Earth. No oxygen had been detected in Venus's atmosphere, suggesting that life as it existed on Earth was not present. It had been determined that Venus's atmosphere contained at least 500 times as much carbon dioxide as the Earth's. These comparatively high levels suggested that the planet might be subject to a runaway greenhouse effect with surface temperatures as high as 600 K (327 °C; 620 °F), but this had not yet been conclusively determined.

The Mariner spacecraft would be able to verify the latter hypothesis by measuring the temperature of Venus close-up; at the same time, the spacecraft could determine if there was a significant disparity between night and daytime temperatures. An on-board magnetometer and suite of charged particle detectors could determine if Venus possessed an appreciable magnetic field or an analog to Earth's Van Allen Belts.

As the Mariner spacecraft would spend most of its journey to Venus in interplanetary space, the mission also offered an opportunity for long-term measurement of the solar wind of charged particles and to map the variations in the Sun's magnetosphere. The concentration of cosmic dust beyond the vicinity of Earth could be explored as well.

==== Experiments ====
Experiments for the measurement of Venus and interplanetary space included:

- A crystal microphone for measurement of the density of cosmic dust, mounted on the central frame.
- A proton detector for counting low-energy protons in the solar wind, also mounted on the central frame.
- Two Geiger-Müller (GM) tubes and an ion chamber, for measuring high-energy charged particles in interplanetary space and in the Venusian equivalent of Earth's Van Allen Belts (which were later shown not to exist). These were mounted on Mariner's long axis to avoid the magnetic fields of the control equipment as well as secondary radiation caused by cosmic rays hitting the metal structure of the spacecraft.
- An Anton special-purpose GM tube, for measuring lower energy radiation, particularly near Venus, also mounted away from the central frame.
- A three-axis fluxgate magnetometer for measuring the Sun's and Venus's magnetic fields, also mounted away from the central frame.
- A microwave radiometer, a 20 in (510 mm) diameter, 3 in (76 mm) deep, parabolic antenna designed to scan Venus up and down at two microwave wavelengths (19 mm and 13.5mm), slowing down and reversing when it found a hot spot. The 19 mm wavelength was for measuring the temperature of the planet's surface while the 13.5mm wavelength measured the temperature of Venus's cloudtops. The instrument was mounted just above the central frame.
- Two infrared optical sensors for parallel measurement of the temperature of Venus, one at 8 to 9 microns, the other at 10-10.8 microns, also mounted above the central frame.

Not included on any of the Mariner R spacecraft was a camera for visual photos. With payload space at a premium, project scientists considered a camera an unneeded luxury, unable to return useful scientific results. Carl Sagan, one of the Mariner R scientists, unsuccessfully fought for their inclusion, noting that not only might there be breaks in Venus's cloud layer, but "that cameras could also answer questions that we were way too dumb to even pose".

=== Flight plan and ground operations ===
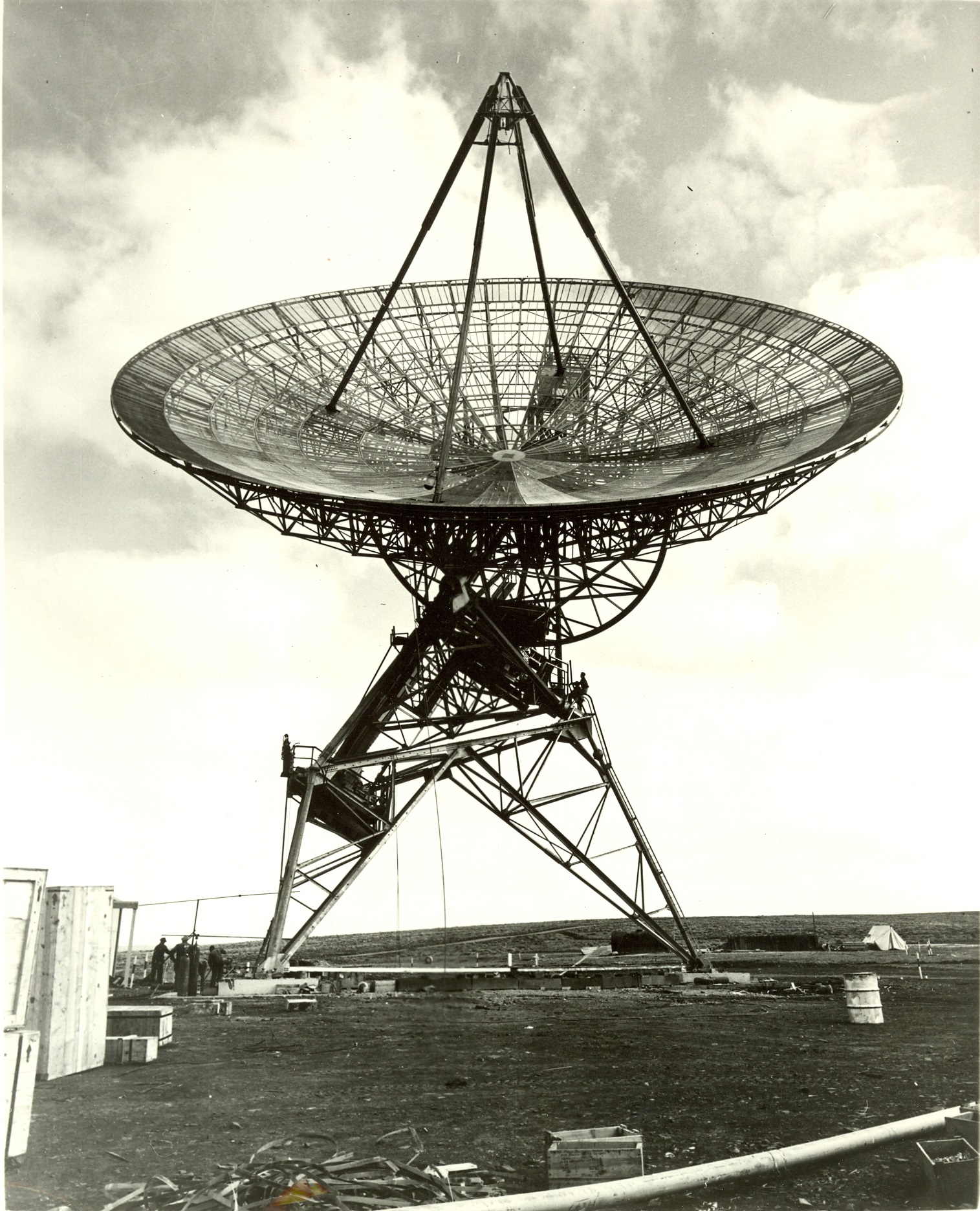
The communications station at Woomera

The launch window for Mariner, constrained both by the orbital relationship of Earth and Venus and the limitations of the Atlas Agena, was determined to fall in the 51 day period from July 22 through September 10. The Mariner flight plan was such that the two operational spacecraft would be launched toward Venus in a 30-day period within this window, taking slightly differing paths such that they both arrived at the target planet within nine days of each other, between December 8 and 16. Only Cape Canaveral Launch Complex 12 was available for the launching of Atlas-Agena rockets, and it took 24 days to ready an Atlas-Agena for launch. This meant that there was only a 27-day margin for error for a two-launch schedule.

Each Mariner would be launched into a parking orbit, whereupon the restartable Agena would fire a second time, sending Mariner on its way to Venus (errors in trajectory would be corrected by a mid-course burn of Mariner's onboard engines). Real-time radar tracking of the Mariner spacecraft while it was in parking orbit and upon its departure the Atlantic Missile Range would provide real-time radar tracking with stations at Ascension and Pretoria, while Palomar Observatory provided optical tracking. Deep space support was provided by three tracking and communications stations at Goldstone, California, Woomera, Australia, and Johannesburg, South Africa, each separated on the globe by around 120° for continuous coverage.

== Launch failure ==
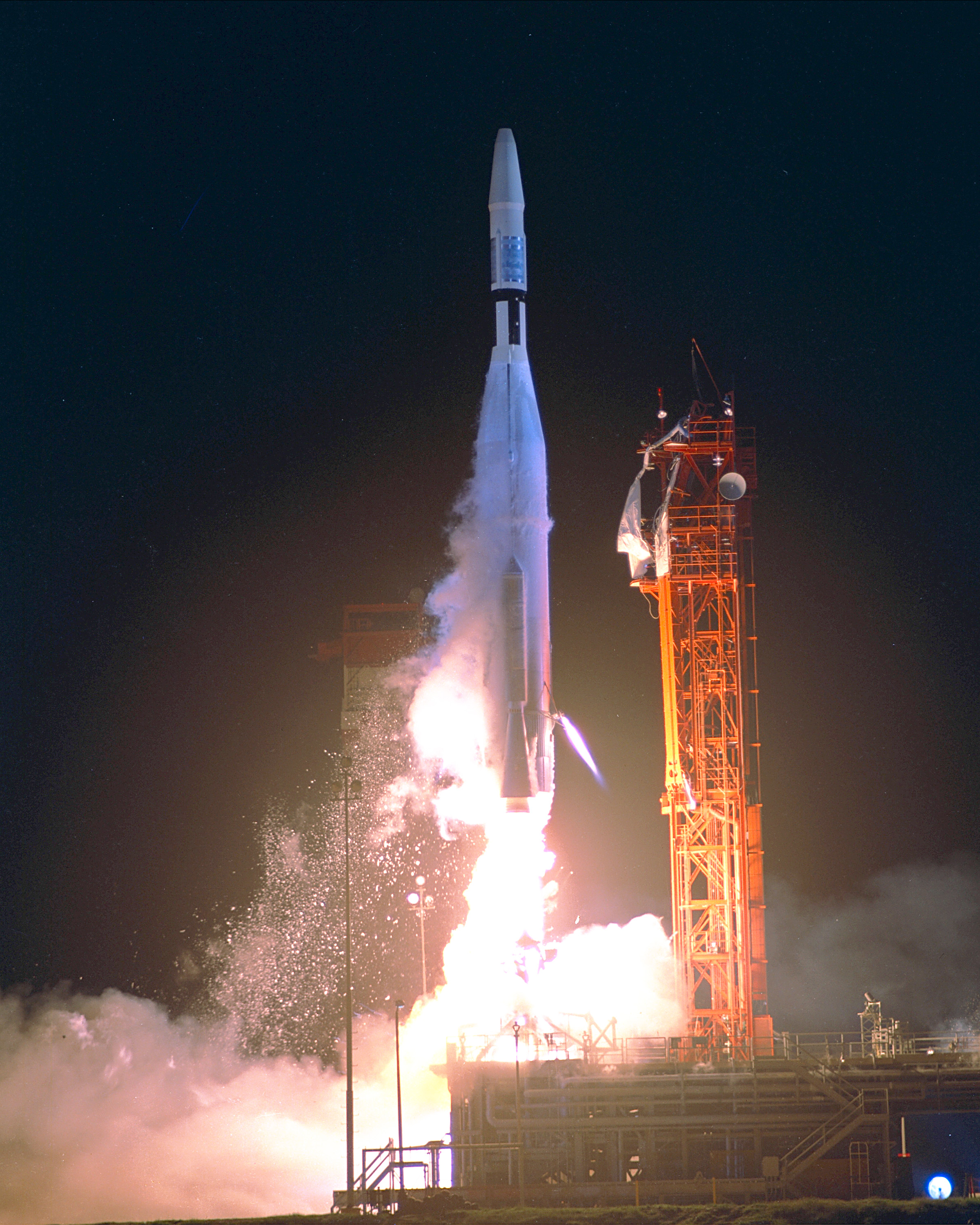
Atlas Agena with Mariner 1

The launch of Mariner 1 was scheduled for the early morning of July 21, 1962. Several delays caused by trouble in the range safety command system delayed the beginning of the countdown until 11:33 p.m. EST the night before. At 2:20 a.m., just 79 minutes before launch, a blown fuse in the range safety circuits caused the launch to be canceled. Countdown was reset that night and proceeded, with several holds, planned and unplanned, from 11:08 p.m. through the early morning of the next day.

At 9:21:23 a.m. on July 22, 1962, Mariner 1's Atlas-Agena lifted off from LC-12. The launch went entirely according to plan up to booster separation. During sustainer phase, the guidance system began issuing improper steering instructions, causing the Atlas to fishtail left and right. Its flight trajectory began to point downward and to the left of where it was supposed to be, creating the danger that it could hit crowded Atlantic shipping lanes. At 9:26:16 a.m., just six seconds before the Agena second stage was scheduled to separate from the Atlas, at which point destruction of the rocket was no longer possible, a range safety officer ordered the rocket to self-destruct, which it did. The Atlas Flight Termination System was also designed to destroy the Agena if activated, but the Agena had no Flight Termination System of its own and could not be destroyed following Atlas SECO. Telemetry signals were received from the probe for another 1-1/2 minutes. Mariner program director Jack James believed the destruction of the rocket was unnecessary, as it could only have hit the middle of the ocean.

=== Cause of the malfunction ===
Because of Mariner 1's gradual rather than sharp deviation from its course, JPL engineers suspected that the fault lay in the flight equations loaded into the computer that guided Atlas-Agena from the ground during its ascent. After five days of post-flight analysis, JPL engineers determined what had caused the malfunction: an error in the guidance computer logic combined with a hardware failure.

The Burroughs guidance computer used data transmitted to it from the rate beacon on the Atlas and used this information to issue steering commands. The guidance program was supposed to contain a character called an R-bar that instructed the computer to ignore data coming from the Atlas's rate beacon if it failed in-flight (to prevent incorrect commands from being sent), but it had been accidentally left out of the program, which a technician at Cape Canaveral had entered into the computer without realizing it had a mistake in it (the very same mistake that would afflict Phobos 1 26 years later).

During its ascent, Mariner 1's booster briefly lost guidance-lock with the ground. Because this was a fairly common occurrence, the Atlas-Agena was designed to continue on a preprogrammed course until guidance-lock with the ground resumed. When lock was reestablished, however, the faulty guidance logic caused the program to erroneously report that the "velocity was fluctuating in an erratic and unpredictable manner", which the program tried to correct for, causing actual erratic behavior, which forced the range safety officer to destroy the rocket.

The incorrect logic had previously been used successfully for Ranger launches, but the rate beacon had not malfunctioned on those, so the problem did not show up there. The Mod III-G guidance system used on Atlas-Agena vehicles was a persistent source of trouble and malfunctioned on many launches after Atlas-Agena began flying in 1960. It was an adaption of the Mod III guidance system used on Atlas B, C, and D missiles, which had the original vacuum tube electronics converted to transistors, but the modification had been done hastily and was unreliable. After repeated Atlas-Agena guidance failures, the Mod III-G was redesigned in 1963 to properly accommodate transistor electronics.

The catastrophic effects of a small error "summed up the whole problem of software reliability" and contributed to the development of the discipline of software engineering.

Subsequent popular accounts of the accident often referred to the erroneously missing character as a "hyphen": e.g., The New York Times reported "For Want of Hyphen, Venus Rocket is Lost" and Arthur C. Clarke described the malfunction as "the most expensive hyphen in history". In actuality, it was a missing overline in "R-dot-bar sub n", the "nth smoothed value of the time derivative of a radius R". The overline denotes a mean; by its omission, an unsmoothed value was used, leading to the control system overreacting.

== Legacy ==
The loss of America's first interplanetary spacecraft constituted an $18.5 million (roughly $196,900,000 in 2026 dollars) setback for NASA. The incident underscored the importance of a thorough pre-launch debugging of software as well as a need to engineer programs such that minor errors could not cause catastrophic failures. The procedures implemented as a result served NASA well, ultimately salvaging the Project Apollo Moon landings; though there were program errors in the Lunar Excursion Module software during descent, they did not cause mission failure.

With the logic error quickly discovered, no undue delay was necessary. The identical Mariner 2 was already on hand, and a second launch from the same pad was manageable before the end of August. On August 27, 1962, Mariner 1's sister spacecraft was successfully launched, becoming the first spacecraft to return data from the vicinity of Venus on December 14, 1962.

== See also ==
- List of missions to Venus
- List of software bugs
