= The Fields =

The Fields may refer to:

- The Fields (film), a horror film starring Cloris Leachman and Tara Reid
- The Fields (novel), a 1946 novel by Conrad Richter
- The Fields (2013 novel), a 2013 novel by Kevin Maher
- The Fields (album), a 1996 album by jazz saxophonist Glenn Spearman
- Texas Killing Fields (film), also known as The Fields, a 2011 crime film

== See also ==
- Fields (disambiguation)
- Field (disambiguation)
- The Field (disambiguation)
