= Ørsted (satellite) =

Satellite

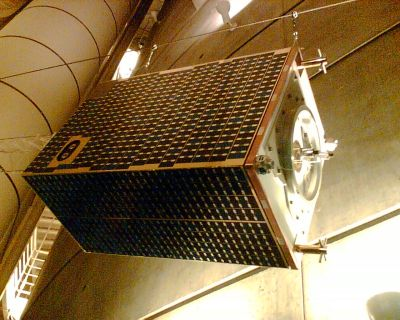
- Model of the Ørsted Satellite in the Tycho Brahe Planetarium
- Mission type: Earth observation
- Operator: Danish Meteorological Institute
- COSPAR ID: 1999-008B
- SATCAT no.: 25635
- Mission duration: 365 days (planned); 27 years, 1 month and 19 days (elapsed)

Spacecraft properties
- Manufacturer: Computer Resources International (Terma A/S)
- Launch mass: 60.8 kg
- Dimensions: 34 x 45 x 72 cm (and an 8 m boom)
- Power: 54 W (nominal)

Start of mission
- Launch date: 23 February 1999, 10:29:55 UTC
- Rocket: Delta II 7920-10 (Delta # 267)
- Launch site: Vandenberg, SLC-2W
- Contractor: Boeing

Orbital parameters
- Reference system: Geocentric
- Regime: Low Earth (near–sun synchronous)
- Perigee altitude: 630.0 km
- Apogee altitude: 850.0 km
- Inclination: 96.1°
- Period: 100.0 minutes
- Epoch: 23 February 1999

Ørsted is an Earth science satellite launched in 1999 to study the Earth's geomagnetic field. It is Denmark's first satellite, named after Hans Christian Ørsted (1777–1851), a Danish physicist and professor at the University of Copenhagen, who discovered electromagnetism in 1820.

== Objectives ==
The spacecraft's primary science objectives are to perform highly accurate and sensitive measurements of the geomagnetic field and to perform global monitoring of the high energy charged particle environment.

== Instruments ==
The instrumentation consisted of two magnetometers (proton precession and fluxgate), a star imager for attitude determination, a solid-state charged particle detector package, and a GPS receiver. The Science Instrument Team is responsible for the design of the instruments, while the Science Team is responsible for the science mission planning and international science participation. The science data obtained during the planned one-year mission will be used to derive an updated model of the geomagnetic field and its secular variation and to study the magnetospheric field-aligned currents and their relationship to ionospheric and solar wind conditions.

The principal research topics are in two areas: 1° studies of the generation of the magnetic field in the fluid core and the magnetic and electrical properties of the solid Earth; and 2° studies of Earth's magnetic field as the controlling parameter of the magnetosphere and of all the physical processes that take place in the Earth's plasma environment, including phenomena like aurora and magnetic storms.

The primary scientific instruments on the Ørsted satellite are:

- An Overhauser Effect Scalar Magnetometer provides extremely accurate measurements of the strength of the geomagnetic field. The Overhauser magnetometer is situated at the end of an 8 meter long boom, in order to minimize disturbances from the satellite's electrical systems.
- A Compact Spherical Coil (CSC) Fluxgate Vector Magnetometer, used to measure the strength and direction of the geomagnetic field. The magnetometer is situated somewhat closer to the satellite body in the so-called "gondola", together with:
- A star tracker developed by the Danish Space Research Institute, to determine the orientation of the satellite.

The other three instruments are located in the main body of the satellite:

- The Charged Particle Detector, used to measure the flux of fast electrons, protons and alpha particles around the satellite.
- A Turbo-Rogue GPS receiver, the main use of the receiver is to accurately determine the position of the satellite. Periodically this instrument may also be used to investigate the atmospheric pressure, temperature, and humidity beneath the satellite.

To utilize the Ørsted science data return, the plan is to establish an internationally recognized research environment in the field of solar-terrestrial physics, a Solar-Terrestrial Physics Laboratory, comprising magnetospheric, ionospheric, and atmospheric physics in combination with research in the magnetic field of the Earth. Correlative studies will be carried out using observations from existing monitoring stations in Greenland and other polar regions.

== Mission ==
The spacecraft was launched, on 23 February 1999 at 10:29:55 UTC, by a Delta II rocket, from the Vandenberg Air Force Base SLC-2W pad, as an auxiliary payload (primary payload was ARGOS and another auxiliary payload was SUNSAT; the auxiliary payload satellites were launched free of charge) into a near-Sun synchronous elliptical polar orbit, it had a perigee of 630 kilometres (390 mi), an apogee of 850 kilometres (530 mi), an inclination of 96.1, and an orbital period of 100.0 minutes, and nodal drift rate 0.76°/day. It is gravity-gradient stabilized, with its extendable 8 metres (26 ft) boom aligned to and pointing away from the center of the Earth. Active attitude control is achieved using three-axis magnetic torquing coils. The data system features onboard monitoring and pre-processing. Data is stored in a 16 Mbyte on-board memory and downlinked in a packetized format when a ground station is in view.

In 2010, Ørsted passed within 500 meters of debris from the 2009 satellite collision but suffered no damage.

Based on data from the Ørsted satellite, researchers from the Danish Space Research Institute concluded that the Earth's magnetic poles are moving, and that the speed with which they are moving has been increasing for the past few years. This apparent acceleration indicates that the Earth's magnetic field might be in the process of reversing, which could have serious consequences for land-based biological life. The results have been published in several prominent scientific journals, and printed on the cover pages of Geophysical Research Letters, Nature, and Eos.

Ørsted was the first in a planned sequence of microsatellites to be flown under the now discontinued Danish Small Satellite Programme.

After more than twenty years in orbit, the Ørsted satellite is still operational (as of 2023), and continues to downlink accurate measurements of the Earth's magnetic field. Ørsted was constructed by a team of Danish space companies, of which CRI was prime contractor. CRI was acquired by Terma A/S before Ørsted was launched, and the daily operations are run jointly by Terma A/S and the Danish Meteorological Institute.

== See also ==
- Swarm (ESA mission)
- Magsat
