= SUNSAT =

South African amateur radio satellite

The Stellenbosch UNiversity SATellite or SUNSAT (COSPAR 1999-008C) was a miniaturized satellite designed and manufactured in South Africa. It was South Africa's first satellite, and was launched aboard a Delta II rocket from the Vandenberg Air Force Base on 23 February 1999. Sunsat was built by post-graduate engineering students at the University of Stellenbosch. Its AMSAT designation was SO-35 (Sunsat Oscar 35).

Last contact by ground control with SUNSAT was on 19 January 2001, and on 1 February 2001 the end of SUNSAT's functional life in orbit was announced. The satellite operated in orbit for nearly two years.

It is predicted to reenter the atmosphere after about 30 years from launch.

== Specifications ==
SUNSAT satellite specifications:

- Size: 45 x 45 x 60 cm
- Mass: 64 kg
- Launcher: Delta II rocket, Mission P-91
- Program cost: US $5M (Approximate); the launch was free of charge as SUNSAT was orbited as a secondary payload. The primary payload of the launch was ARGOS, and the Danish Orsted satellite was another secondary payload.
- Planned lifetime: 4–5 years (NiCad Battery pack life)
- Main payloads:
  - Amateur radio communications
  - Data interchange
  - Stereo multispectral imager
- Attitude control: Gravity gradient and magnetorquers, reaction wheels when imaging
- Accuracy: 3 mrad pitch/roll, 6 mrad yaw
- 2 Micro Particle Impact Detectors were included as part of experiments conducted in orbit
  - A team (Zaahied Cassim and Rashid Mohamed) from Peninsula Technikon designed and built circuits for both their own piezo film technology and NASA supplied capacitive sensors.
- SSC 25636

=== Pushboom imager ===
- Ground pixel size: 15 m x 15 m
- Image width: 51.8 km
