= Field =

Field may refer to:

== Expanses of open ground ==
- Field (agriculture), an area of land used for agricultural purposes
- Airfield, an aerodrome that lacks the infrastructure of an airport
- Playing field, used for sports or games

== Arts and media ==
- In decorative art, the main area of a decorated zone, often contained within a border, often the background for motifs
  - Field (heraldry), the background of a shield
  - In flag terminology, the background of a flag
- FIELD (magazine), a literary magazine published by Oberlin College in Oberlin, Ohio
- Field (sculpture), by Anthony Gormley

== Organizations ==
- Field department, the division of a political campaign tasked with organizing local volunteers and directly contacting voters
- Field Enterprises, a defunct private holding company
  - Field Communications, a division of Field Enterprises
- Field Museum of Natural History, in Chicago

== People ==
- Field (surname)
- Field Cate (born 1997), American child actor

== Places ==
- Field, British Columbia, Canada
- Field, Kentucky, United States
- Field, Minneapolis, Minnesota, United States
- Field, Ontario, Canada
- Field, Staffordshire, England, United Kingdom
- Field, South Australia
- Field Hill, British Columbia, Canada
- Field Island, Nunavut, Canada
- Mount Field (disambiguation), mountains in Canada, the United States, Australia and Antarctica

== Science, technology, and mathematics ==
=== Computing ===
- Field (computer science), a smaller piece of data from a larger collection (e.g., database fields)
- Column (database), sometimes referred to as 'field', with various meanings

=== Mathematics ===
- Field (mathematics), a type of algebraic structure
  - Number field, a specific type of the above algebraic structure
- Scalar field, assignment of a scalar to each point in a mathematical space
- Spinor field, assignment of a spinor to each point in a mathematical space
- Tensor field, assignment of a tensor to each point in a mathematical space
- Vector field, assignment of a vector to each point in a mathematical space
- Field of sets, a mathematical structure of sets in an abstract space
- Field of a binary relation, union of its domain and its range

=== Optics ===
- Field of view, the area of a view imaged by a lens
  - Visual field, the part of the field of view which can be perceived by the eye's retina
- Field (video), one half of a frame in an interlaced display

=== Physics ===
- Field (physics), a mathematical construct for analysis of remote effects
  - Electric field, a term in physics to describe the capacity of an electrically charged object to affect other charges at a distance
  - Magnetic field, a multipolar field that describes the magnitude of magnetic interaction in space
  - Electromagnetic field, the combination of electric and magnetic fields
  - Gravitational field, a representation of the combined effects of remote gravitational masses on a test particle at each point

=== Sociology ===
- Field (Bourdieu), a sociological term coined by Pierre Bourdieu to describe the system of objective relations constituted by various species of capital
- Sexual field, the systems of objective relations within collective sexual life

=== Other uses in science and technology ===
- Field (geography), a spatially dependent variable
- Field (mineral deposit), a mineral deposit containing valuable resources in a cost-competitive concentration
- Field research or fieldwork, the collection of information outside a laboratory, library or workplace setting

== Other uses ==
- Field of study, a subdivision of an academic discipline
- Field of use, permissible operation by the licensee of a patent
- Track and field, a group of sports

== See also ==
- The Field (disambiguation)
- Fields (disambiguation)
- The Fields (disambiguation)
- Fielding (disambiguation)
- Feeld, a location-based social discovery service application for iOS and Android
- Feild, surname
