= Terma A/S =

Danish Aerospace Manufacturer

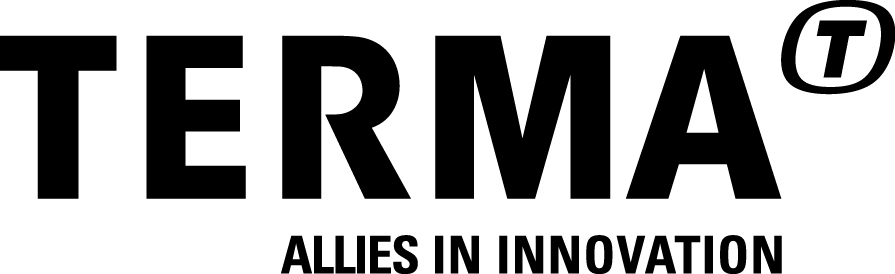
- Industry: Electronics, Defense, Aerospace
- Founded: 1944
- Headquarters: Denmark
- Key people: Henriette Hallberg Thygesen (CEO)
- Products: Aeronautics, Space, Surveillance & Mission Systems
- Revenue: DKK 2,883 billion (2024/2025)
- Net income: DKK 293 million (2024/2025)
- Number of employees: 2,000 (2025)
- Website: www.terma.com

Terma A/S is a Danish defense and aerospace manufacturer for both civilian and military applications, and is owned by the Danish company Thrige Holding A/S. It is Denmark's largest company within the aerospace and the defense industry, employing approximately 2,200 people worldwide.

The company was founded in 1944 by Orla and Svend Aage Jørgensen; it originally focused on the production of thermometers and manometers for ships and various other metal components. Following its purchase by Thorkild Juncker, Terma A/S refocused itself on the production of electronic measuring instruments along with early radar systems; it expanded rapidly during the 1950s and 1960s. The firm became a leader in defense electronics, and had diversified into air defense systems, aircraft avionics, and parts for missile systems by 1970. It continued to grow, acquiring various other Danish defense firms during the 1990s. In 1999, Terma A/S acted at the prime contractor for the Ørsted satellite, the first Danish satellite to be launched into space.

By 2013, the group's international customers contribute more than 87% of Terma's total sales. Terma A/S headquarters are located in Lystrup near Århus, Denmark. In Denmark, other Terma facilities are located at Grenaa and Herlev. Terma international locations and operations include Leiden in the Netherlands; Darmstadt near Frankfurt, Germany; Harwell, UK; Singapore, Abu Dhabi, United Arab Emirates and New Delhi, India. In 2004 the company opened an office in Warner Robins, Georgia. Today, the company's U.S. activities also include the Terma North America Inc. headquarters in Arlington, Virginia and offices in Fort Worth, Texas, Norfolk, Virginia and Atlanta, Georgia.

== History ==
During 1944, amid the final months of the Second World War, the company was founded by the brothers Orla and Svend Aage Jørgensen as a small mechanical workshop based in Aarhus, Denmark; the name Terma is said to be derived from the firm's early work on thermometers and manometers. Five years later, it was restructured as a limited liability company under the name Fabrik for Måleinstrumenter TERMA A/S; at the point of incorporation, the company had fewer than 10 employees. During 1949, it was bought by Thorkild Juncker. Juncker shifted Terma A/S in the direction of electronic measuring instruments and with the employment of a Norwegian engineer soon developed a radar that would prove to be competitive in both price and quality. Within six years of buying Terma, Juncker was employing up to 120 people before his untimely death in 1955. It was under Juncker's ownership and management that Terma developed into the company it is today.

Throughout the 1950s, Terma A/S conducted numerous large-scale projects involving the overhaul and upgrade of radars, computer systems, and air defense systems on behalf of the Danish Armed Forces. Its first radar systems were for navigation purposes and installed mainly on secondary vessels. Over a period of 20 years, Terma A/S opted to focus much of its resources onto the development of numerous products related to radars, computers, and missile systems, and started to expand into the wider European market. During the 1960s, Terma A/S secured work within several international programs, such as the development and production of the RIM-7 Sea Sparrow surface-to-air missile; the firm continued to be involved in the Sea Sparrow's support for over fifty years. In 1961, Terma A/S commenced development of the first Doppler radar, which was used to measure the velocity of the Sidewinder air-to-air missile. During 1966, the firm was awarded the first European contract to deliver a ground check-out system for satellites.

The 1970s was a turbulent time for Terma A/S in terms of its ownership; it briefly became a subsidiary of several firms, including the Dannebrog Holding Group and the Bumeister & Wain Group . During the early 1970s, Terma A/S became an active participant in the space industry, beginning production of equipment for a variety of scientific satellite missions over the following years, supplying both hardware and software systems for this sector. In 1977, Terma A/S took over the Bravour company, through which it established its own extensive range of VHF-based communication equipment which, amongst other customers, was heavily used by the Danish Armed Forces. Following Denmark's decision to purchase the Swedish-built Saab 35 Draken fighter aircraft during the early 1970s, Terma A/S was awarded its first contract for supply of critical aircraft electronics. Around this same time, the firm also became involved in the supply of various aviation electronics systems for the General Dynamics F-16 Fighting Falcon fighter aircraft, particularly those that were purchased by European customers; this co-production arrangement was considered a break-through for Terma A/S.

During 1980, the Thomas B. Thrige Foundation took over the majority of the stocks in Terma A/S. That decade, following an order from the Royal Danish Air Force, the company developed an original self-protection system compatible with both fixed-wing aircraft and helicopters. Terma A/S also developed new command and control systems for Royal Danish Navy vessels at its newly-created project department, based in Tåstrup, outside Copenhagen. During 1993, the company reached an agreement with NATO for the establishment of a maintenance and upgrade center for the MIM-23 Hawk surface-to-air missile system. In 1996, Terma A/S's AN/ALQ213(V) Electronic Warfare Management System was approved for use by the United States Air Force; it was subsequently installed upon in excess of 1,000 American aircraft. In the late 1990s, Terma A/S acquired Computer Resources International, a Danish aerospace and defense company, as well as the Danish aircraft company Per Udsen Co. Aircraft. During 1999, the Danish Ørsted satellite was successfully launched with Terma A/S being the lead supplier on the project; it was the first, and so far only, Danish satellite to be launched into space.

During 2000, Terma A/S was also contracted by the Royal Netherlands Air Force to supply its self-protection systems for the service's Boeing CH-47 Chinook and Eurocopter AS532 Cougar helicopter fleets. In 2001, the firm's Power Conditioning Unit was adopted for the European Space Agency's (ESA) deep space missions, including Rosetta, Mars Express and Venus Express. That same year, Terma announced its renaming from Terma Elektronik A/S to simply Terma A/S, which was accompanied by a new logo and graphic design. During 2004, Terma relocated all of its Copenhagen-based activities to a new office at the Herlev area; that same year, Terma North America Inc. opens offices in the US. In the early 2000s, the firm established agreements with the American defence contractors Lockheed Martin and General Dynamics to act as a subcontractor on the production of the Lockheed Martin F-35 Lightning II fighter aircraft; the firm was subsequently chosen to develop and produce several components and designs for the F-35, including the gun pod and miscellaneous aerostructures. In 2006, a similar arrangement was agreed with Eurofighter GmbH for the Eurofighter Typhoon fighter aircraft; Terma A/S also worked with Saab on its Saab JAS 39 Gripen fighter.

In August 2024, the company announced the appointment of Henriette Hallberg Thygesen as its new chief executive, replacing Jes Munk Hansen.

== Business areas and products ==
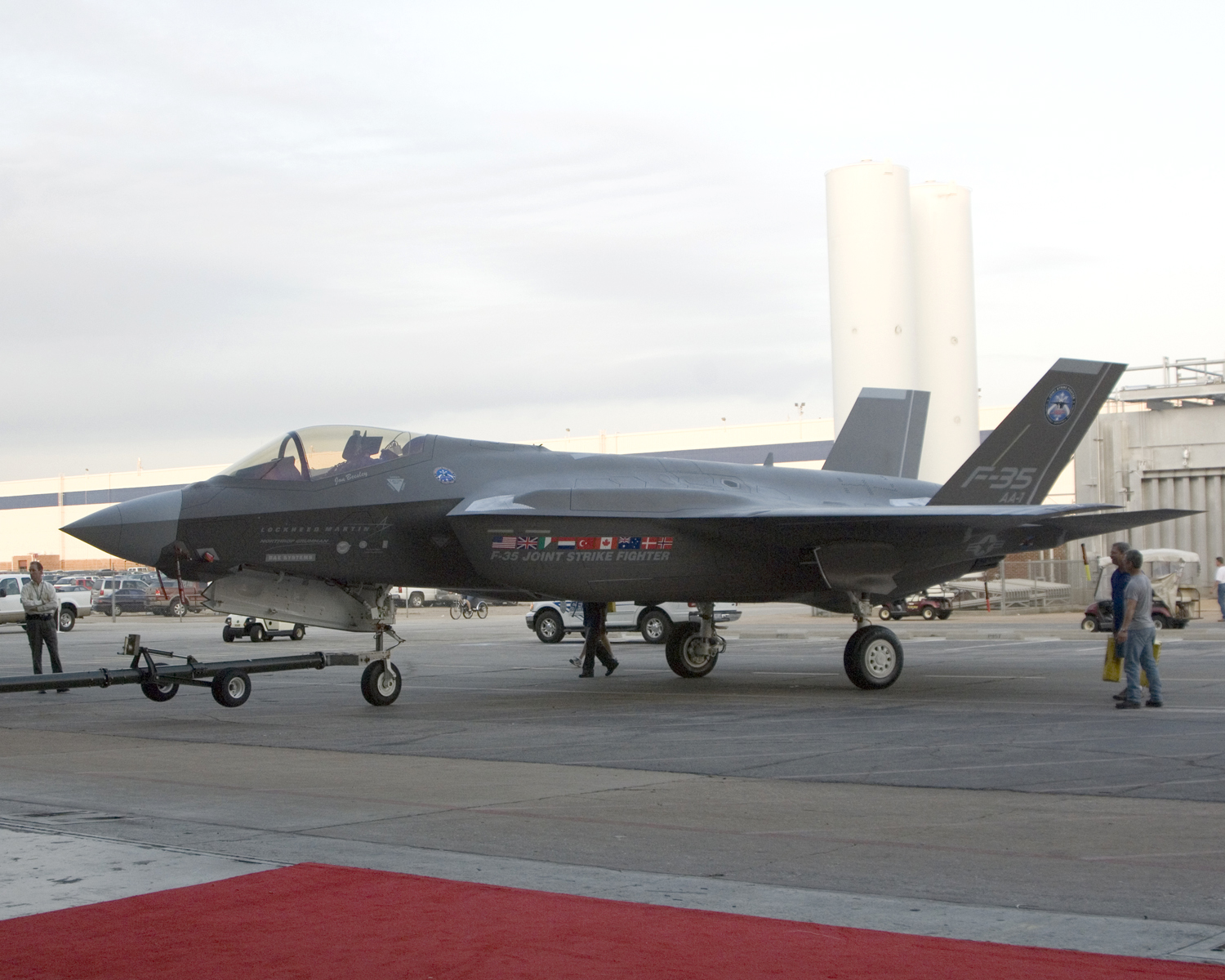
Terma delivers parts and technologies for the F-35 Lightning

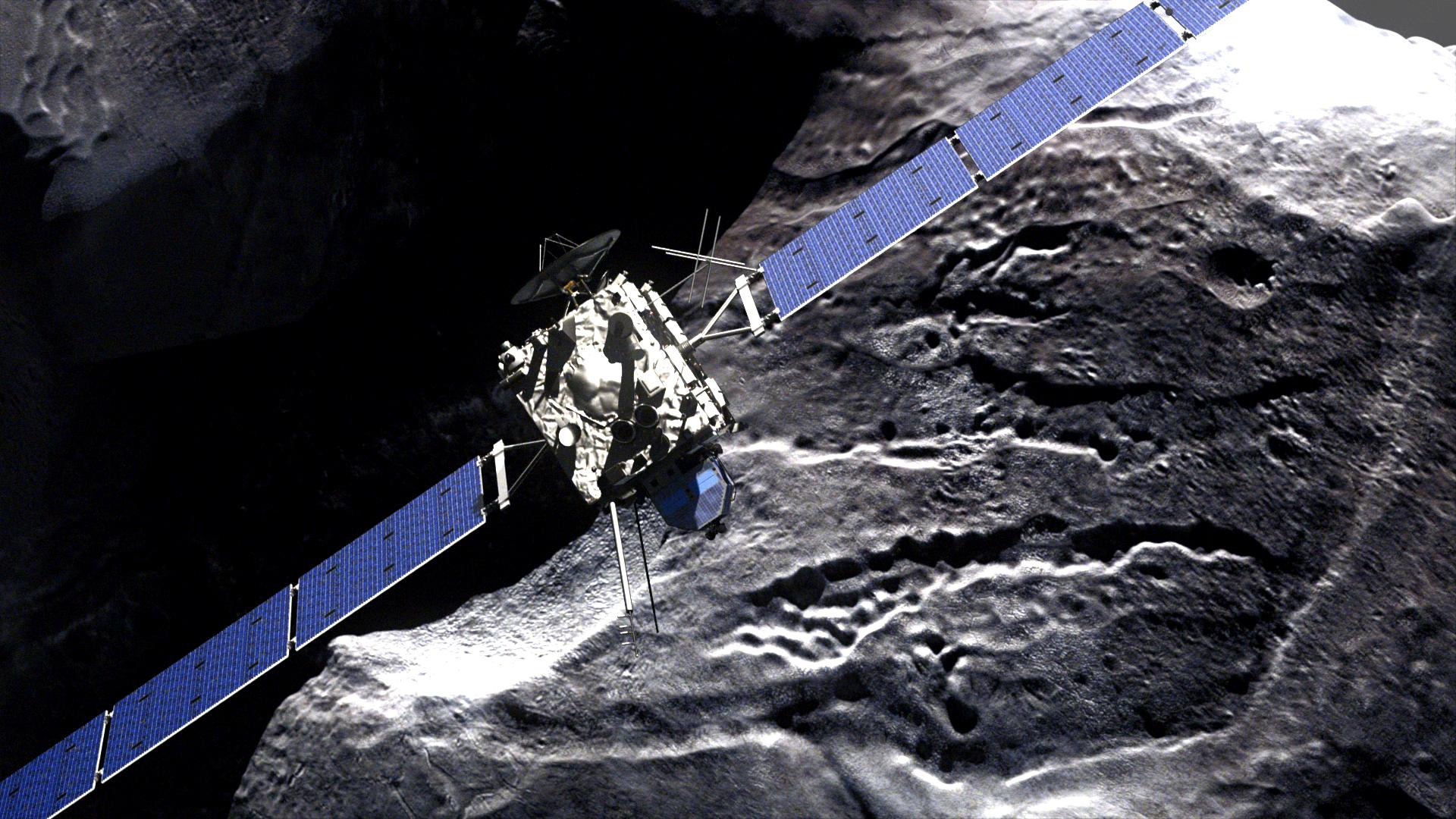
The power conditioning unit and solar panels of the Rosetta spacecraft is produced by Terma

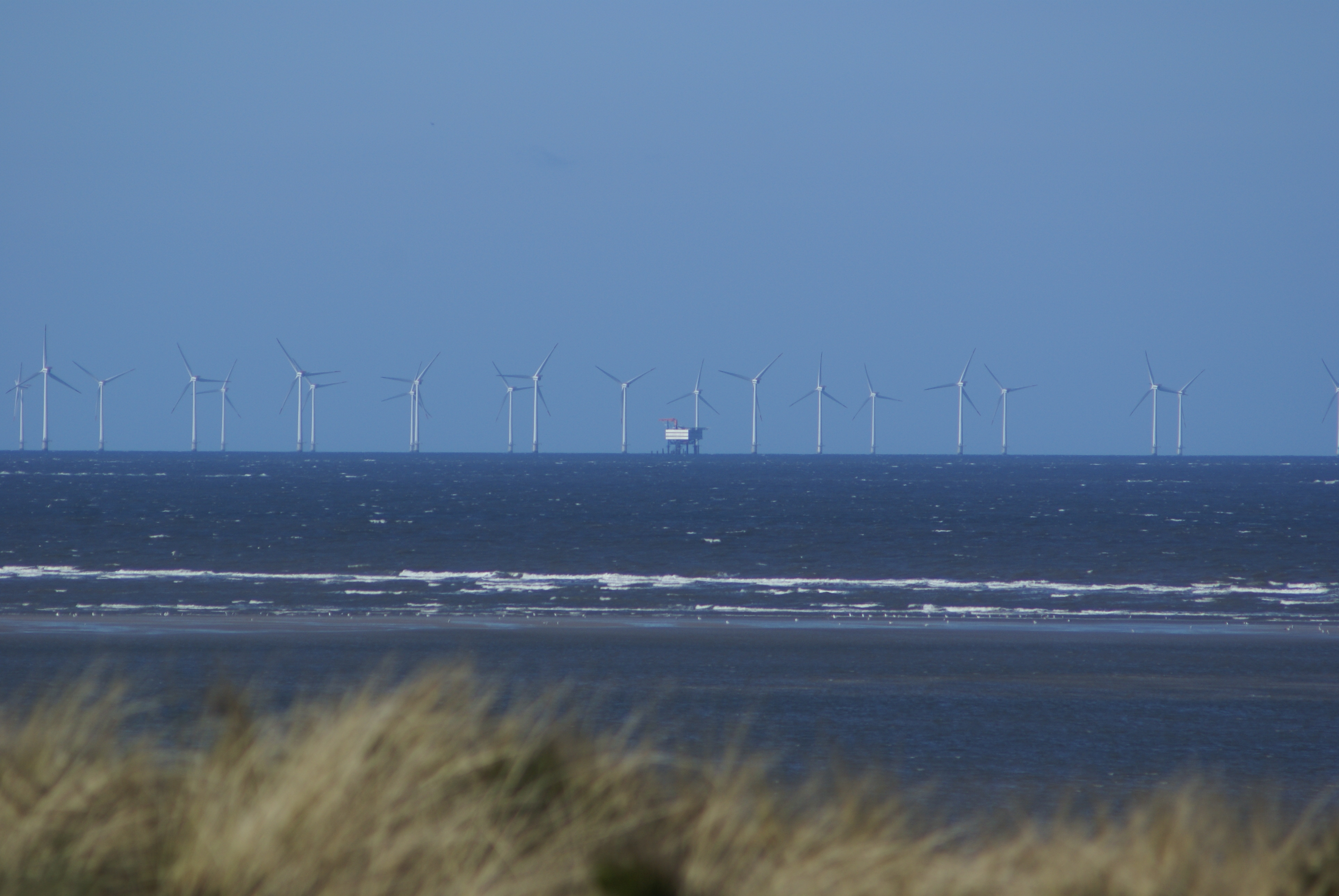
Terma's radar systems are used around Horns Rev wind farm to avoid the turning blades of the turbines from appearing as objects

The business areas of Terma can be divided into the following categories: Aerostructures, Space, Defense, and Security & Surveillance:

=== Aerostructures ===
Terma Aerostructures A/S is headquartered in Grenaa, Denmark, focusing on design and manufacture of aerostructures for aerospace and defense companies.

Terma is a strategic supplier to the F-35 Lightning II, delivering a series of parts, components, and technologies to the fighter aircraft. The company delivers leading edges through Lockheed Martin, composite tail parts through BAE Systems, gun pods for the F-35B and C versions through General Dynamics, as well as fuselage parts and electronics through Northrop Grumman Corporation. Overall, Terma delivers more than 70 parts for the F-35 Lightning II.

=== Space ===
Space (SPD), providing on-board electronics and software for satellites as well as control centres. Key focus areas are power conditioning systems and star trackers for satellites.

==== Power conditioning units ====
Terma delivers power conditioning systems to a series of major space products, including ESA's BepiColombo and Rosetta. In the case of BepiColombo, the power conditioning unit is the most powerful used on missions by the ESA with a capacity of 14 kW powered by solar energy on its destination planet Mercury.

In the Rosetta project Terma has developed a 64 square meter solar panel providing power at down to four percent of the Earth's solar energy and at working temperatures down to -130 degrees Celsius. The PCU delivers a bus power capability of 1500 watt at a weight of 8.3 kilo.

==== Star trackers ====
Since 1999, Terma has manufactured Star Trackers for several scientific satellite missions including Cryosat 1, Cryosat-2, ADM-Aeolus, LISA Pathfinder, and Tacsat 1, 2 and 4.

==== Atmosphere-Space Interactions Monitor (ASIM) ====
Terma is prime contractor for the ASIM observatory. Terma is responsible for ensuring technical management of the project and for the coordination with ESA and subcontractors, and not least for delivering the ASIM observatory for handover to ESA, NASA, and SpaceX at Kennedy Space Center (KSC). ASIM was launched for the International Space Station (ISS) on 2 April 2018, and will be installed on the European Columbus-module of ISS in the beginning of 2018. ASIM will be used by scientists in order to study high-altitude electrical discharges, the so-called red sprites, blue jets, haloes, and elves, and monitor X-ray and Gamma-ray flashes.

=== Defense ===
Terma produces C-Flex command and control systems for naval ships; as of 2013, it has been installed upon ships of the Danish, Lithuanian, Romanian and Thai Navy. The C-Flex systems and the Terma SCANTER radar systems are supplied to new-built ships such as the Royal Thai Navy Landing Docks, the Danish Absalon-Class Support Ships, and the Danish Iver Huitfeldt-class frigates as well as upgrades on ships in service, such as the Danish Thetis-Class and offshore patrol vessels.

The company develops electronic warfare protection systems and 3D-audio systems as upgrades for the F-16 fighters of the Royal Danish Air Force. Additionally, Terma has supplied electronic warfare solutions for the EPAF countries and the U.S. Air National Guard for F-16, A-10, Tornado and Harrier aircraft. Terma develops aircraft survivability equipment for a variety of SAR and transportation helicopters, including the 14 Royal Danish Air Force EH-101 Merlin helicopters in collaboration with Agusta Westland, and self-protection systems for the Royal Netherlands Air Force AH-64D and CH-47 Chinook helicopters. The Terma Electronic Warfare Management Systems are fielded internationally on more than 2,000 fighter and transportation aircraft and helicopters.

Terma A/S also produces Missile Warning Systems as an integral part of the electronic warfare solution for the F-16s of the Danish and Norwegian air forces, mounting the systems on pylons instead of the traditional fuselage installation.

=== Security and surveillance ===
The Terma SCANTER 5202 radar is used by coast guard services including the U.S. Coast Guard, the Spanish Guardia Civil, the Colombian Coast Guard, the Norwegian Coast Guard, Port of London, and Port of Hong Kong to track marine vessels and aircraft, while the Terma ET2 embedded tracker is developed to help track stealth objects or smaller objects in the presence of clutter.
