= Magnetometer (Juno) =

Scientific instrument on the Juno space probe

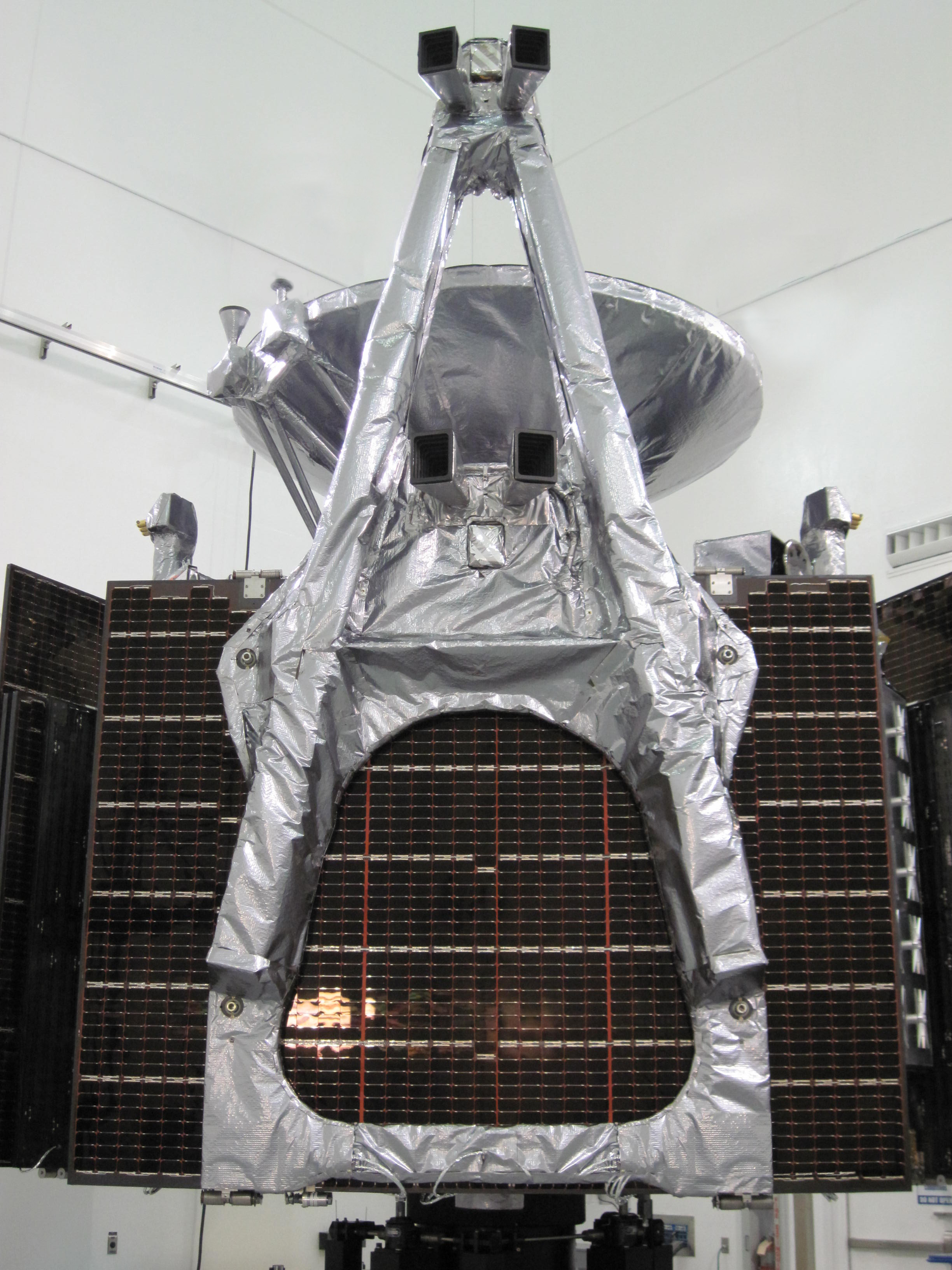
NASA caption for this image: "... The two Magnetic Field Experiment (MAG) sensor suites can be seen on the 4-meter-long dedicated magnetometer boom in the foreground. The MAG boom is deployed in flight at the outer end of one of the spacecraft's three solar arrays. The outboard sensor suite consists of a Fluxgate Magnetometer (FGM) visible just above the 2 Advanced Stellar Compass (ASC) light baffles that look outward at a slight angle. The inboard MAG sensor suit is identical, but rotated 180 degrees and located 2 meters away. When deployed, the two sensor suites will be about 10 and 12 meters from the center of the spacecraft. The spacecraft is shown in launch configuration with solar arrays and MAG boom stowed. Image credit: NASA/JPL-Caltech/LMSS"

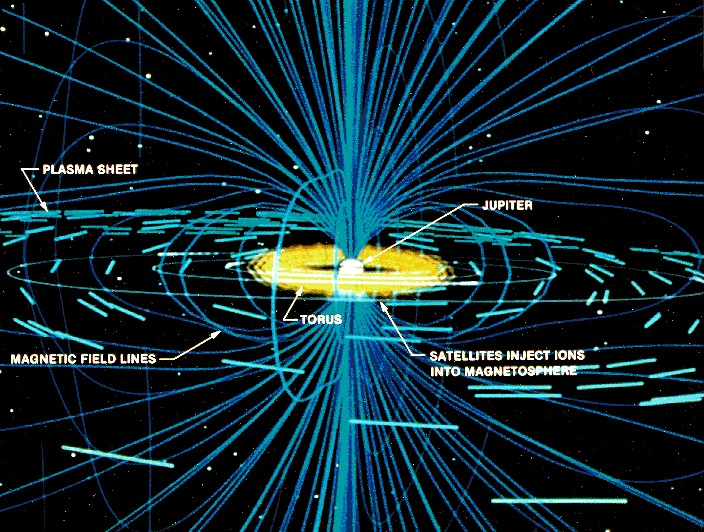
Graphic of Jupiter's magnetosphere with Io plasma torus in yellow

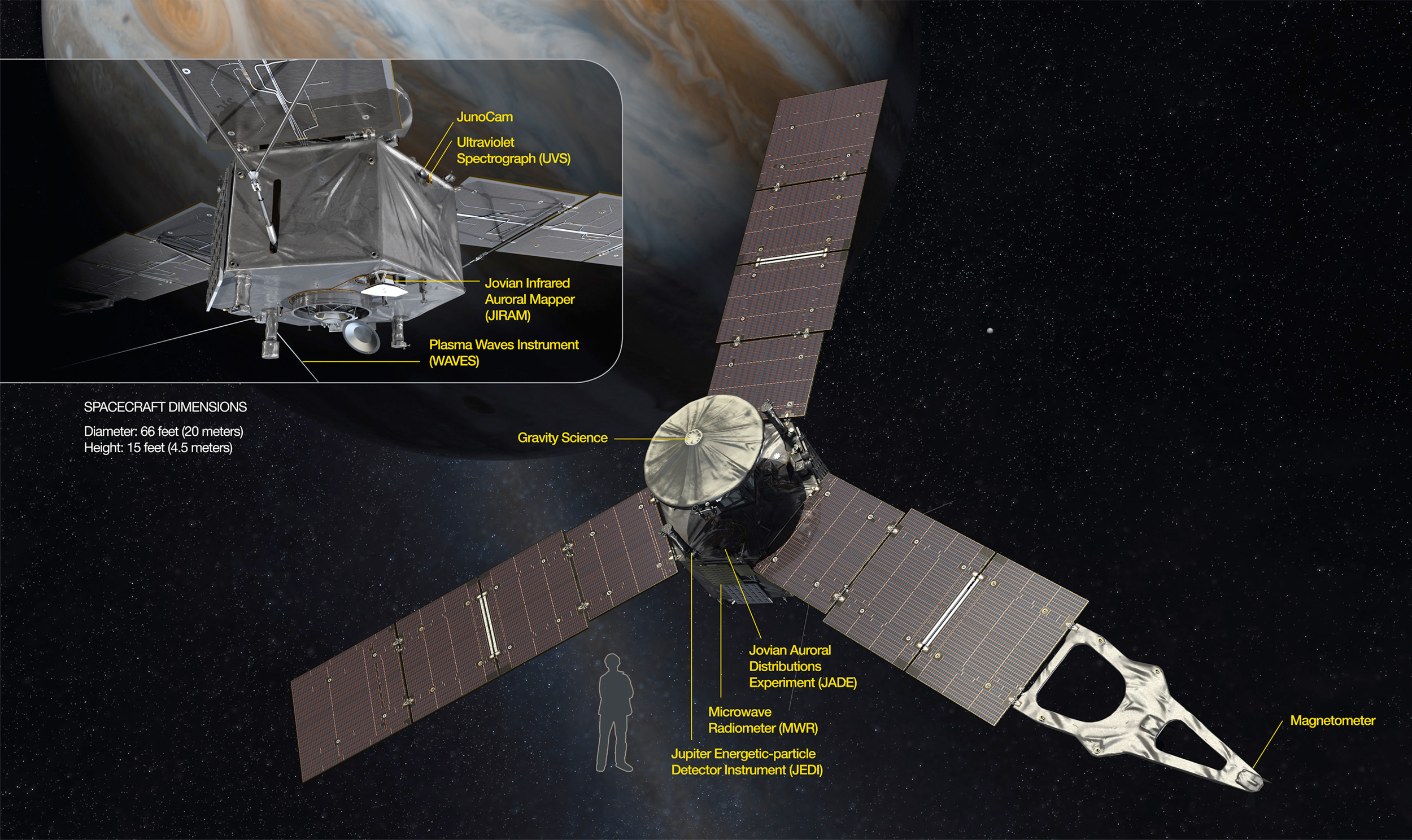
Artist generated diagram showing the location of various instruments. MAG is on the lower right of this graphic

Magnetometer (MAG) is an instrument suite on the Juno orbiter for planet Jupiter. The MAG instrument includes both the Fluxgate Magnetometer (FGM) and Advanced Stellar Compass (ASC) instruments. There two sets of MAG instrument suites, and they are both positioned on the far end of three solar panel array booms. Each MAG instrument suite observes the same swath of Jupiter, and by having two sets of instruments, determining what signal is from the planet and what is from spacecraft is supported. Avoiding signals from the spacecraft is another reason MAG is placed at the end of the solar panel boom, about 10 m (33 feet) and 12 m (39 feet) away from the central body of the Juno spacecraft.

The MAG instrument is designed to detect the magnetic field of Jupiter, which is one of the largest structures in the Solar System. If one could see Jupiter's magnetic field from Earth, it would appear five times larger than the full moon in the sky despite being nearly 1700 times farther away. Jupiter's internal magnetic field prevents the solar wind, a stream of ionized particles emitted by the Sun, from interacting directly with its atmosphere, and instead diverts it away from the planet, effectively creating a cavity in the solar wind flow, called a magnetosphere, composed of a plasma different from that of the solar wind.

Mission goals:

- map the magnetic field of Jupiter
- determine the dynamics of Jupiter's interior
- determine the three-dimensional structure of the polar magnetosphere and its auroras.

Jupiter has the strongest and biggest magnetic fields known to exist in the solar system. Studying these fields is one of the goals of the Juno mission, and in particular the task rests on the Magnetometer instruments. MAG measures the field about 60 times per second, and records the direction and strength of the field. MAG collected data on Earth during its 9 October 2013 flyby en route to Jupiter (this was a gravity assist maneuver, but also was to collect data).

Another advantage to studying Jupiter's field is that on Earth, crustal magnetism interferes with measurements of the field generated deep in the core, partially shielding it from measurements. On Earth the field is generated by spinning liquid iron, whereas on Jupiter is generated by hydrogen. Jupiter is mostly hydrogen (about 90%), and as it compresses from gravity it turns conductive in a special form. However, it is not known if farther in, where it should compress into metallic form, the hydrogen continues to conduct electricity. That is one of the questions Juno may answer. In addition to studying Jupiter, the MAG also returned data on the Earth's magnetosphere.

The MAG instrument was delivered to Lockheed Martin Space Systems' facility in Denver, Colorado, United States for integration into the Juno spacecraft by NASA's Goddard Spaceflight Center (GFSC) in October 2010. MAG was overall designed and built at the NASA Goddard Space Flight Center (GFSC) in Greenbelt, Maryland. The Advanced Stellar Compass was built and contributed by the Technical University of Denmark. (Technical University of Denmark, or in Danish (Danish: Danmarks Tekniske Universitet) commonly known as DTU) The FGM and ASC were turned on in late August after Juno's launch on 5 August 2011. The ASC allow a very precise determination of the magnetometers orientation in space. They are star trackers that take a picture of the sky, then compare those images to a catalog of star maps to allow the orientation to be determined.

Juno's magnetometers will measure Jupiter's magnetic field with extraordinary precision and give us a detailed picture of what the field looks like both around the planet and deep within, ...

— Juno Mission's Deputy Principal Investigator and head of the magnetometer team

The fluxgate magnetometer (FGM) is similar to previous instruments flown on spacecraft like the Voyagers, Magsat, Active Magnetospheric Particle Tracer Explorers, Mars Global Surveyor, etc. This style of FGM uses twin wide-range, triaxial flux gate sensors mounted far away from the spacecraft body in which the magnetic flux is periodically switched (hence the ame flux-gate). Two FGM's are used so the separate readings can be combined to make the magnetic field calculation. MAG has two vector fluxgate magnetometers supported by advanced star trackers. The star tracking system allows the orientation of the FGM to be calculated and determined more accurately enhancing the usefulness of the FGM readings.

Jupiter's magnetic fields were previously observed in the 1970s with Pioneer 10 and Pioneer 11, and Voyager 1 and Voyager 2. Magnetometers related to Juno include ones on MAVEN, MGS, Voyager, AMPTE, GIOTTO, CLUSTER, Lunar Prospector, MESSENGER, STEREO, and Van Allen Probes.

At one point, JPL was working on including a Scalar Helium Magnetometer on Juno, in addition to the FGM and ASC suite.

== Results and papers ==
In 2017, a paper called The analysis of initial Juno magnetometer data using a sparse magnetic field representation included analysis of data from the Juno magnetometer which passed 10 times closer than previous probes. The nature of Jupiter's magnetic field was examined, combining the latest results from MAG with a mathematical model called VIP4 spherical harmonic model for the magnetic field of Jupiter.

== See also ==
- Magnetometer (type of instrument to measure magnetic fields)
  - Spacecraft magnetometer
- Magnetosphere of Jupiter
- Earth's magnetic field
- Jupiter Magnetospheric Orbiter
- UVS (Juno)
- Microwave Radiometer (Juno)
- Waves (Juno)
- Gravity Science
- FIELDS (Magnetometer and electrical fields investigation on Parker Solar Probe)
- List of missions to the outer planets
