= Mountfield =

Mountfield may refer to:

== Places ==
- Mountfield, East Sussex, England
- Mountfield, County Tyrone, Northern Ireland

== People ==
- Derek Mountfield (born 1962), English footballer
- Helen Mountfield (born 1967), British barrister and legal scholar
- Robin Mountfield (1939–2011), British civil servant

== Companies ==
- Mountfield, British manufacturer and distributor of domestic and commercial lawn mowers, now a subsidiary of Stiga

== Sport ==
- HC Mountfield, a Czech Republic ice hockey club
- Mountfield HK, a Czech Republic ice hockey club
- MHC Mountfield, a Slovak ice hockey club

== See also ==
- Mount Field (disambiguation)
- Mountfields, Shrewsbury, England
