= The Field =

The Field may refer to:

- The Field (play), a 1965 play by John B. Keane
- The Field (exhibition), 1968 Australian survey exhibition, National Gallery of Victoria
- The Field (1990 film), a film based on the play by John B. Keane
- The Field (2018 film), a short drama film
- The Field (magazine), a field sports magazine published in England since 1853
- The Field (musician), stage name of Axel Willner, Swedish electronic musician
- "The Field", a song by Blood Orange, The Durutti Column, Tariq Al-Sabir, Caroline Polachek and Daniel Caesar, 2025

== See also ==
- Field (disambiguation)
- The Fields (disambiguation)
