= Mount Field =

Mount Field may refer to:

- Mount Field (Antarctica)
- Mount Field (Tasmania), in Australia
  - Mount Field National Park, in Australia
- Mount Field (British Columbia), in Canada
- Mount Field (cricket ground), in Faversham, England
- Mount Field (New Hampshire), in the United States
- Mount Field (Llanfair), in Wales

== See also ==
- Mountfield (disambiguation)
- Field Hill, British Columbia, Canada
- Field (disambiguation)
