= FIELDS =

Scientific instrument on the Parker Solar Probe

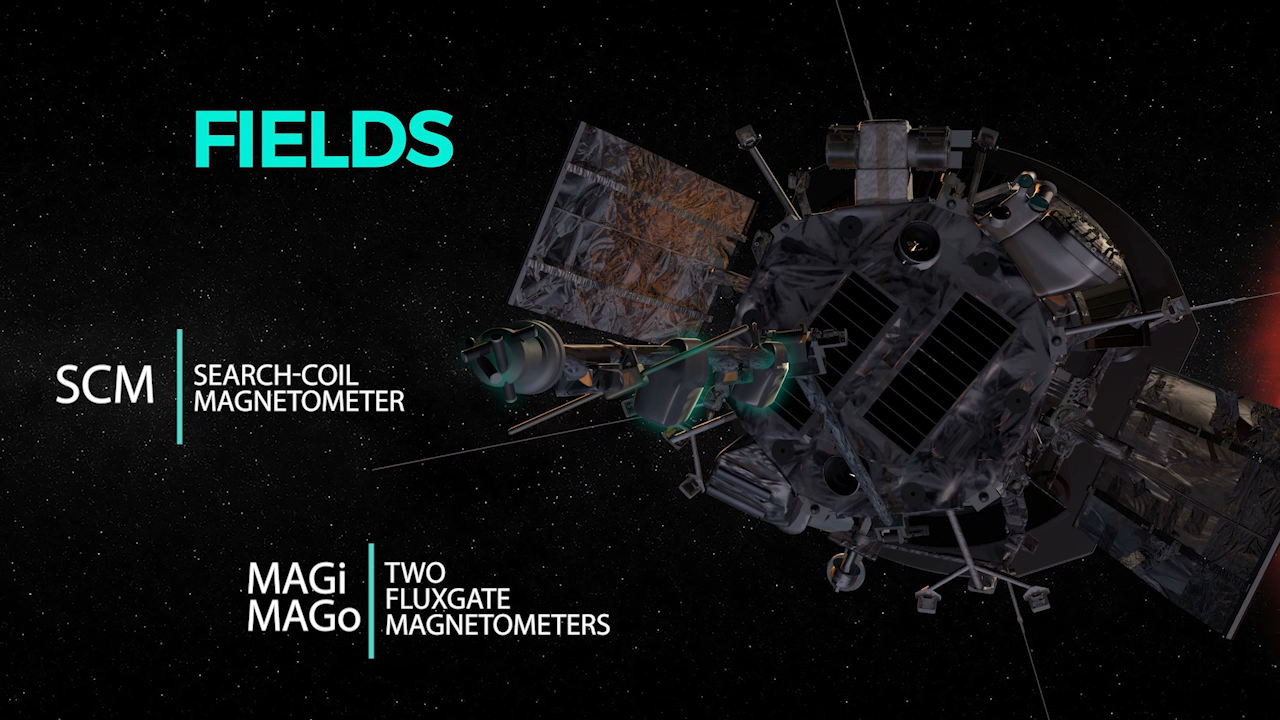
FIELDS instrument location

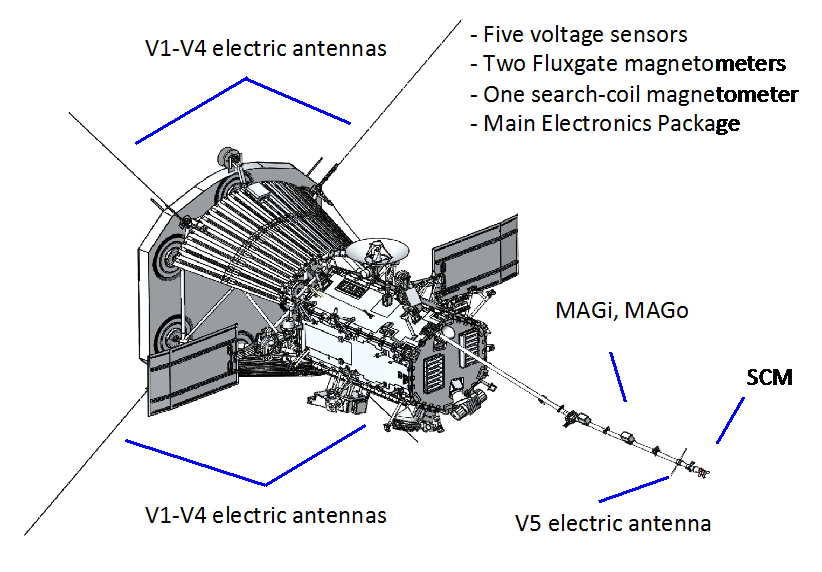
Overview of the FIELDS instrument on the Parker Solar Probe

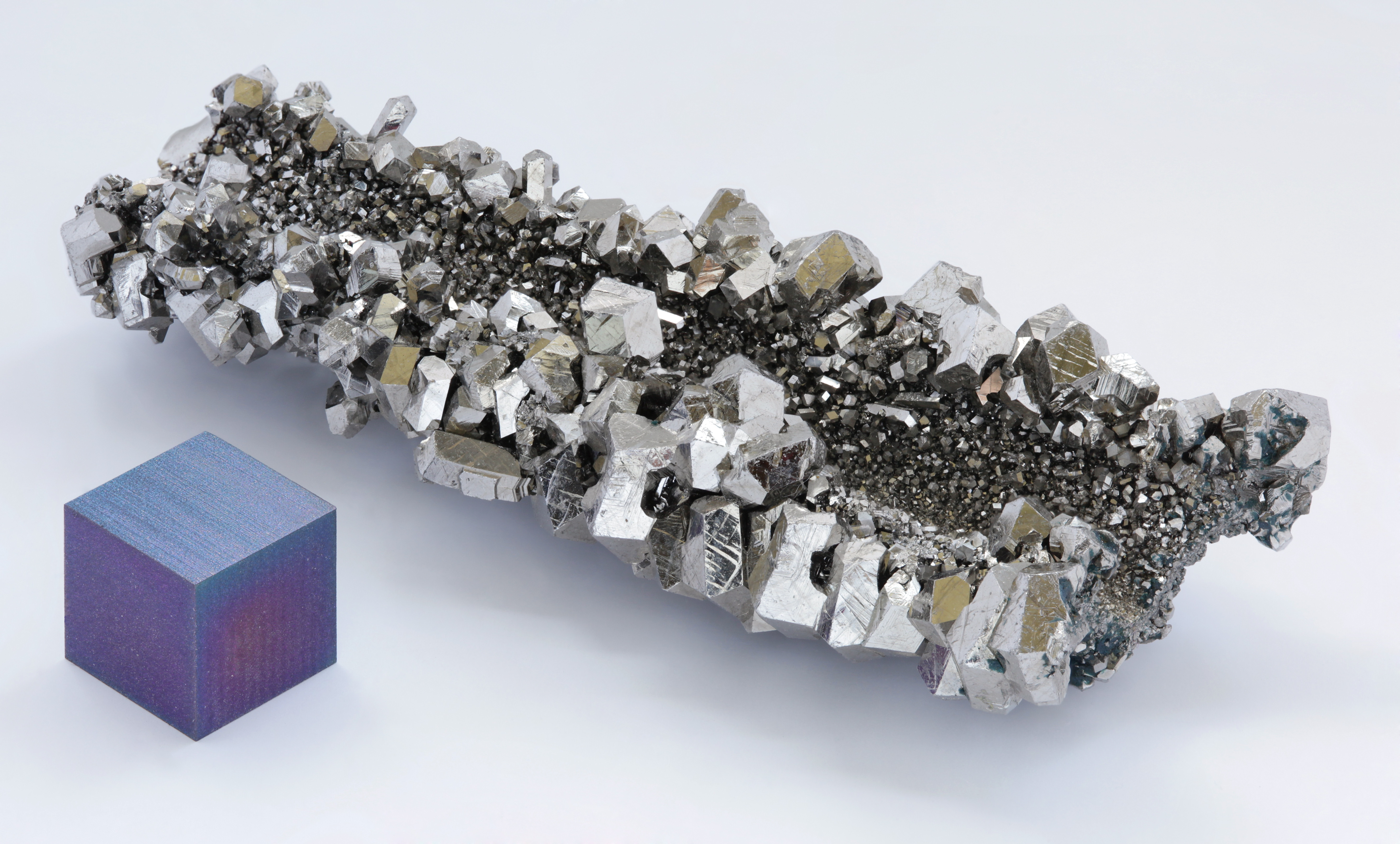
Niobium (shown here) is the main ingredient in the high-temperature C-103 alloy which the four whip antennas are made of, to endure direct exposure to the Sun at planned proximities.

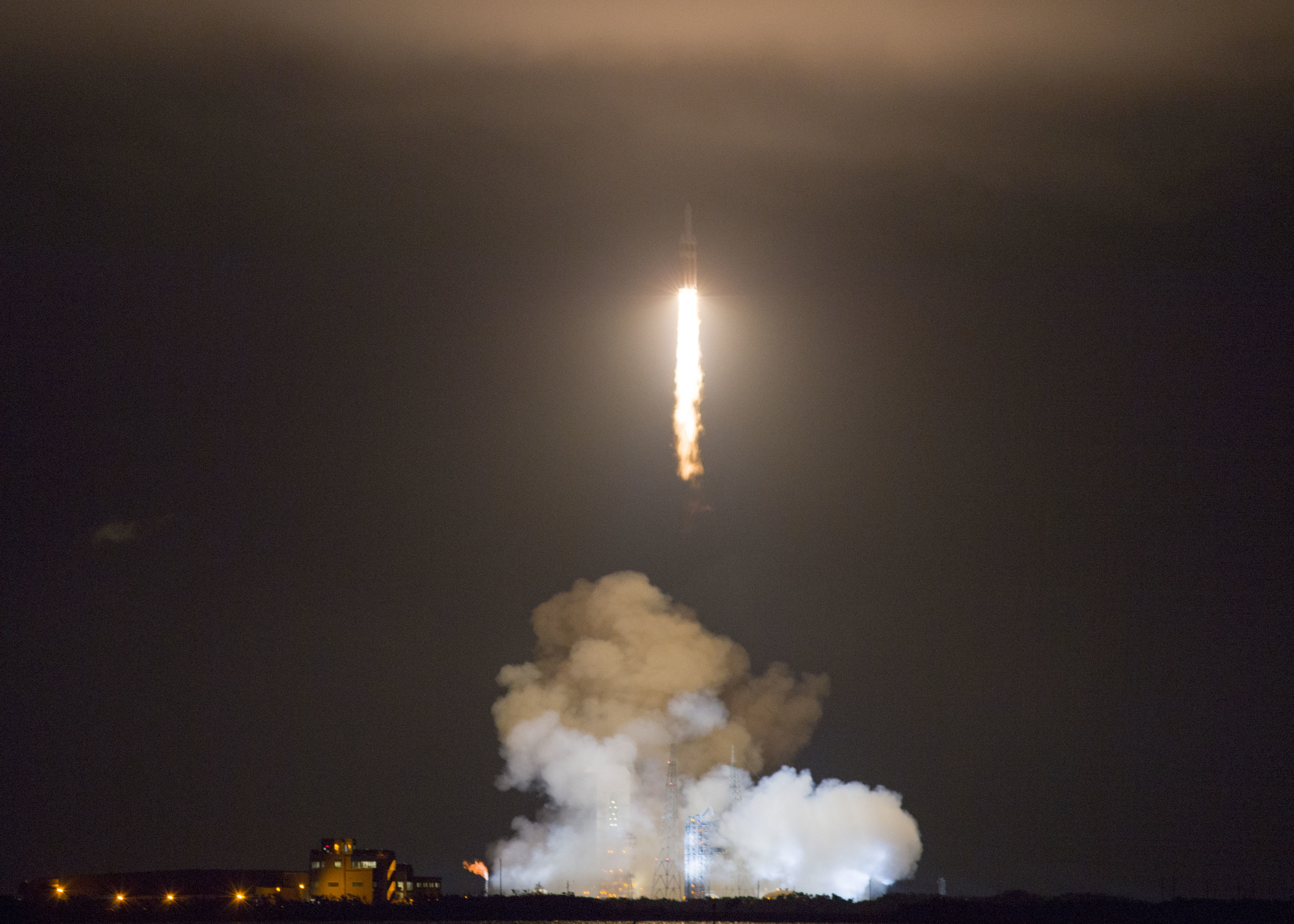
FIELDS heads into space in August 2018 as part of the Parker Solar Probe.

FIELDS is a science instrument on the Parker Solar Probe (PSP), designed to measure magnetic fields in the solar corona during its mission to study the Sun. It is one of four major investigations on board PSP, along with WISPR, ISOIS, and SWEAP. It features three magnetometers. FIELDS is planned to help answer an enduring questions about the Sun, such as why the solar corona is so hot compared to the surface of the Sun and why the solar wind is so fast (a million miles per hour).

The host spacecraft, Parker Solar Probe, was launched by a Delta IV Heavy on August 12, 2018 from Florida, USA. On August 13, 2018 FIELDS became the first instrument to be activated including beginning deployment of the four whip antennas (clamps unlocked) and extension of the magnetometer boom. On September 4, 2018 the whip antennas were deployed.

== Overview ==
FIELDS features three magnetometers: two are fluxgate magnetometers, and the third is a search-coil magnetometer. It has five voltage sensors, four of which extend beyond the spacecraft's heatshield and must directly endure the intense conditions at the planned distances of less than 10 solar radii to the Sun.

For best scientific observations, the spacecraft must approach to approximately about 10 solar radii (4% of the Earth-Sun distance) to take measurements from within the solar corona. The task of FIELDS is to take measurements of the electrical and magnetic fields near the Sun. Most of FIELDS instrumentation is protected, along with the bulk of the spacecraft by a special 4.5 inch (11.43 cm) thick carbon heatshield as the spacecraft is expected to endure temperatures of 2,500 degrees F. While the surface of the Sun is roughly 10,000 degrees F, the solar corona has a temperature exceeding 1 million°F. (about half a million°C)

Planned measurements include:

- electric and magnetic fields and waves
- Alfven waves and turbulence
- poynting flux
- absolute plasma density
- electron temperature
- spacecraft floating potential and density fluctuations
- radio emissions

== Components ==
The key components of FIELDS are:

- Five voltage sensors
- Two fluxgate magnetometers
- One search-coil magnetometer
- Main Electronics Package

Supporting systems include four whip antennas (called V1 through V4) that are 2 meters long and made of C-103 niobium alloy. These antennas are numbered V1, V2, V3, and V4. V5 is a voltage sensor on the end of the spacecraft's magnetometer boom. All five send signals to the Antenna Electronics Board which is part of the Main Electronics Package, and each V1 to V5 has its own pre-amplifier that is sending this signal. The sensors are integrated with various electrical and electronic processing systems which take in the raw signals and convert them into software data for transmission back to Earth by radio communication.

The FIELDS experiment can also detect cosmic dust, by recording the dust impact strikes on the antennas. It will try to detect micron sized and nanodust, if carried by the solar wind. It detects and sizes dust impacts on its antennas by the voltage signature.

== Operations ==
By September 2018, FIELDS had been turned on and first data was returned. Data from FIELDS was designed for return from observations during the closer solar encounters of the Parker Solar Probe spacecraft in October–November 2018 and March–April 2019.

== Timeline ==
- August 12, 2018; launched.
- August 13, 2018; FIELDS instrument is powered on in outer space.
  - The first activity conducted was opening the clamps that hold the antennas down during launch.
  - The next activity was to extend the magnetometer boom.
- September 4, 2018 - four whip antennas deployed/extended.

== See also ==
- Interior Characterization of Europa using Magnetometry, a planned magnetometer for Europa Clipper
- Magnetometer (Juno), a magnetometer on board Juno Jupiter orbiter
- Spacecraft magnetometer
