= Fields (Frisco, Texas) =

- Planned community
- Interactive map of Fields
- Coordinates: 33°12′0.6″N 96°50′35″W
- Country: United States
- State: Texas
- County: Collin, Denton

Area
  - Total: 2,544 sq mi (6,590 km^{2})
  - Land: 2,514 sq mi (6,510 km^{2})
  - Water: 30 sq mi (78 km^{2})
- Elevation: 600 ft (183 m)
- Time zone: UTC-6 (Central (CST))
  - Summer (DST): UTC-5 (CDT)
- ZIP code: 75034, 75035
- Area codes: 214, 469, 972
- Website: fieldsfrisco.com

Fields is an announced planned community in Frisco, Texas, situated on a 2,544-acre site along the Dallas North Tollway, Preston Road, and US 380. Along with housing, office and retail space, parks and a hotel, within Fields will be the new home of PGA of America's headquarters, and the Frisco campus for the University of North Texas.

== Background ==
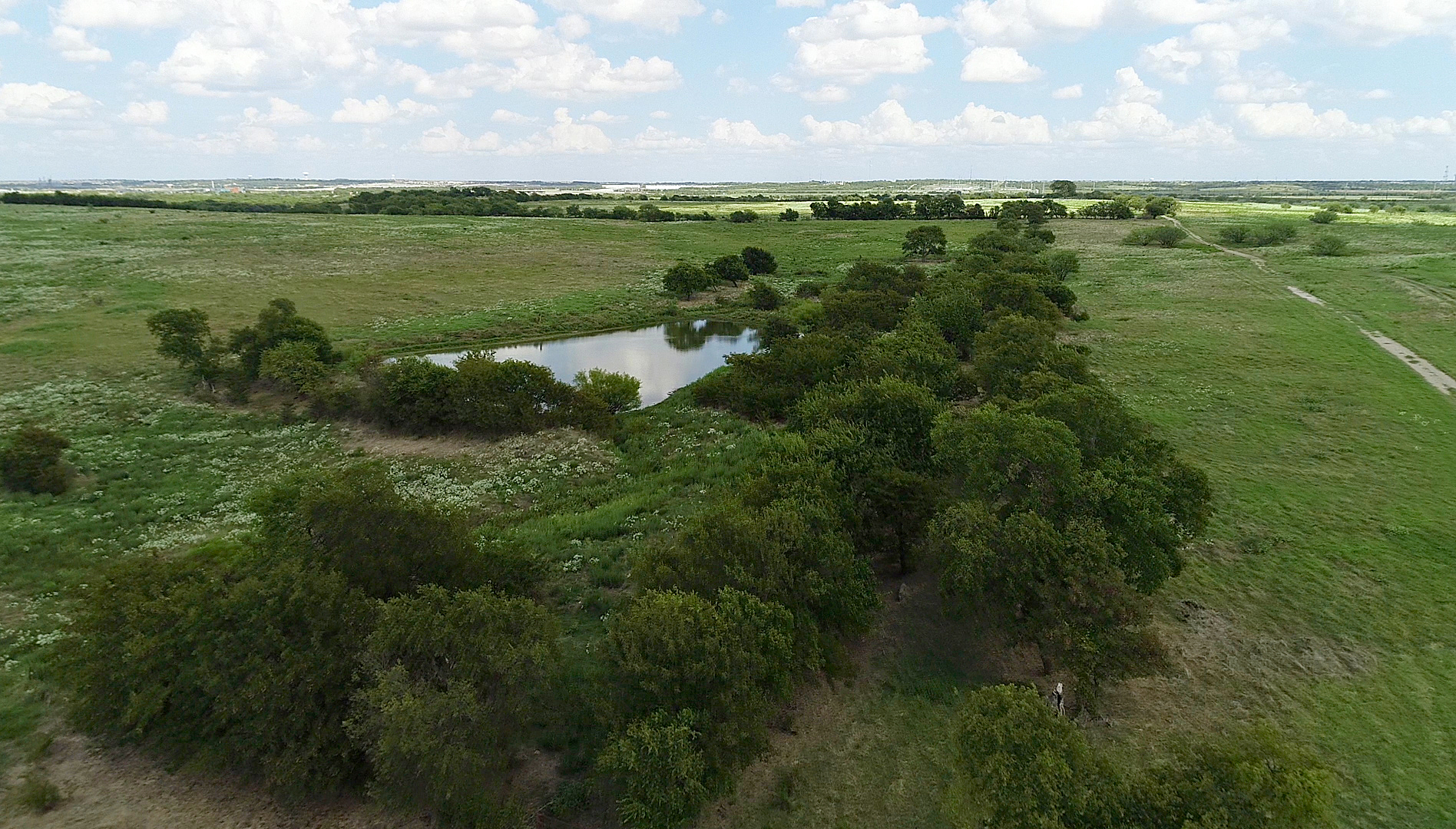
Fields in Frisco, Texas

In August 2018, it was reported that a partnership including Hunt Realty Investments and The Karahan Companies acquired what was then known as Headquarters Ranch, a 2,544-acre site on the northern edge of Frisco, from the estate of Frisco banker Bert Fields, Jr. The project is named after the Fields family, longtime owners of the land. Hunt Realty Investments and The Karahan Companies will develop the land. The development is expected to cost upwards of $12.7 billion.

Fields is being planned with more than 10,000 homes, at least 12 neighborhood parks on 72 acres, and some 18 million square feet of commercial space, including a major office center, a retail village, two golf courses, parks, trails, and other recreation spaces, and a 500-room Omni hotel. It has been projected that 30,000 people could eventually work at Fields. The rezoning of the land was approved on February 25, 2020.

== PGA of America headquarters ==
In April 2018, it was reported that the Professional Golfers' Association of America was planning to move its national headquarters from Palm Beach Gardens, Florida. The deal was finalized in December 2018, and PGA of America officially announced they would be relocating their headquarters to Frisco. The 600-acre development will include two championship golf courses, a short course, practice areas totaling 45 holes, a clubhouse, and an Omni hotel. The golf courses are expected to open in the summer of 2022, and the development will host the KitchenAid Senior PGA Championship in 2023. As home of the PGA, Frisco would host 23 professional golf tournaments in its first 12 years in operation, including the 2027 and 2034 PGA Championships and the Ryder Cup.

== University of North Texas branch ==
Fields will include a branch of the University of North Texas, with student housing on the development. The campus could be as large as 150,000 square feet, with a student population of 3,000. The first part of the campus at Fields is anticipated to be ready by the end of 2022, with the first building structure, a parking lot, bell tower, amphitheater, and a pavilion.

== See also ==
- Frisco, Texas
- Professional Golfers' Association of America
- University of North Texas
