= Explorer 61 =

NASA satellite of the Explorer program

Magsat
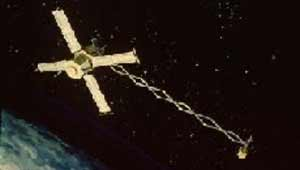
- Explorer 61 (Magsat) satellite
- Names: Explorer 61; Magsat-A; AEM-C; Applications Explorer Mission-C
- Mission type: Space physics
- Operator: NASA / USGS
- COSPAR ID: 1979-094A
- SATCAT no.: 11604
- Mission duration: 7.5 months (achieved)

Spacecraft properties
- Spacecraft: Explorer LXI
- Spacecraft type: Magnetic field Satellite
- Bus: Applications Explorer Mission
- Manufacturer: Goddard Space Flight Center
- Launch mass: 158 kg (348 lb)
- Power: Solar panels and batteries

Start of mission
- Launch date: 30 October 1979, 14:16 UTC
- Rocket: Scout G-1 (S-203C)
- Launch site: Vandenberg, SLC-5
- Contractor: Vought
- Entered service: 30 October 1979

End of mission
- Decay date: 11 June 1980

Orbital parameters
- Reference system: Geocentric orbit
- Regime: Low Earth orbit
- Perigee altitude: 351.90 km (218.66 mi)
- Apogee altitude: 578.40 km (359.40 mi)
- Inclination: 96.80°
- Period: 93.90 minutes

Instruments
- Scalar Magnetometer; Vector Magnetometer

Magsat (Magnetic field Satellite, Applications Explorer Mission-C or AEM-C or Explorer 61) was a NASA / USGS (United States Geological Survey) spacecraft, launched on 30 October 1979. The mission was to map the Earth's magnetic field, the satellite had two magnetometers. The scalar (Cesium vapor) and vector magnetometers gave Magsat a capability beyond that of any previous spacecraft. Extended by a telescoping boom, the magnetometers were distanced from the magnetic field created by the satellite and its electronics. The satellite carried two magnetometers, a three-axis fluxgate magnetometer for determining the strength and direction of magnetic fields, and an ion-vapor/vector magnetometer for determining the magnetic field caused by the vector magnetometer itself. Magsat is considered to be one of the more important Science/Earth-orbiting satellites launched; the data it accumulated is still being used, particularly in linking new satellite data to past observations.

== Mission ==
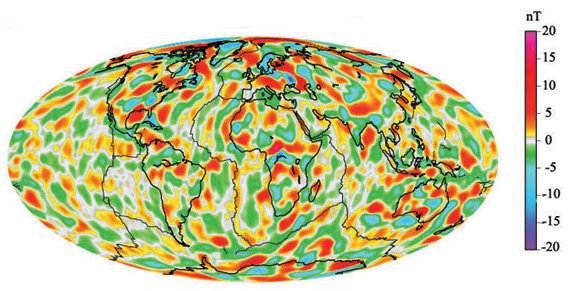
Modeled Earth's magnetic fields, data created by satellites with sensitive magnetometers.

The Magsat project was a joint NASA/USGS effort to measure near-Earth magnetic fields on a global basis. Objectives included obtaining an accurate description of the Earth's magnetic field, obtaining data for use in the update and refinement of world and regional magnetic charts, compilation of a global crustal magnetic anomaly map, and interpretation of that map in terms of geologic/geophysical models of the Earth's crust.

== Spacecraft ==
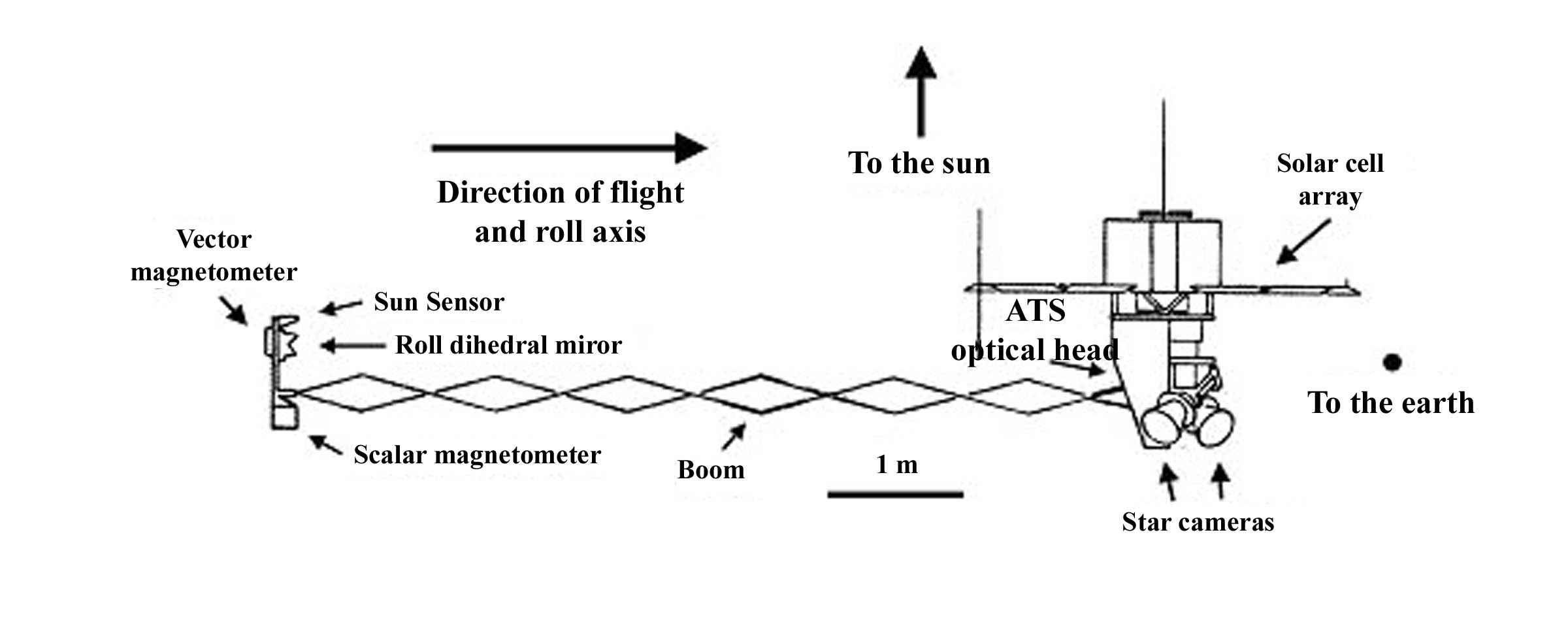
Sketch of Magsat

The Explorer 61 was launched into a low, near-polar, orbit by the Scout vehicle. The basic spacecraft was made up of two distinct parts: the instrument module that contained a vector and a scalar magnetometer and their unique supporting gear; and the base module that contained the necessary data-handling, power, communications, command, and attitude-control subsystems to support the instrument module. The base module complete with its subsystems was composed of residual Small Astronomy Satellite (SAS-C) hardware. The magnetometers were deployed after launch to a position 6 m (20 ft) behind the spacecraft. At this distance, the influence of magnetic materials from the instrument and base module (chiefly from the star cameras) was less than 1 mT. Sixteen complete vector magnetic field measurements and eight scalar measurements were obtained every second.

== Launch ==
On 30 October 1979, Magsat was launched from pad SLC-5 at Vandenberg Air Force Base in California on a Scout G-1 bearing 96.80° in a dusk to dawn orbit. The spacecraft was placed in an orbit with a perigee of 351.90 km (218.66 mi) and an apogee of 578.40 km (359.40 mi). After reaching orbit, its telescoping boom was extended outward by 6 m (20 ft). Two-star cameras were used to define the position of the spacecraft relative to Earth. The orbit allowed the satellite to map a majority of the Earth's surfaces except the geographic poles.

After launch the payload was brought to an orbit of 96.80° facing the Sun as the Earth rotated underneath. It was kept in a close Earth orbit, with vector magnetometers capable of sensing magnetic fields closer to Earth's surface. The data collected by this satellite allowed a 3D mapping of the Earth's magnetic interior as never seen before. In combination with a later satellite, Ørsted, it has been an essential component for explaining the current declining state of the Earth's magnetic field.

== Computers and data processing ==
According to a Johns Hopkins University / Applied Physics Laboratory (JHU/APL) report, and archival NASA source documentation (Johns Hopkins APL Technical Digest, July–September 1980, Vol. 1, No. 3), the Magsat spacecraft utilized two RCA 1802 microprocessors running at a 2-MHz clock speed in a redundant setup. A stored memory of 2.8 kilobytes in PROMs with 1 kilobyte of random-access memory (RAM) provided the program and working space for the microprocessor. Other integrated circuits chips of the CDP 1800 family of circuits were also used, including the CDP 1852 interface circuit and the CDP 1822 1K x 1 RAM, as well as Harris CMOS 6611A PROMs.

Three families of circuits were considered for the computer system design: two NMOS families (the Motorola 6800 and Intel 8080 microprocessors) and the RCA CDP1802 CMOS microprocessor. The RCA 1802 was chosen based on various criteria, including the 1802 CMOS technology being power efficient by two orders of magnitude compared to the NMOS microprocessors, compatibility with the existing power supply of the satellite and the low-power requirements of CMOS, the radiation hardening of the 1802 and lack thereof in the 6800 and 8080, and other 1802-based functioning and features. Software for the project was developed with an in-house APL-generated 1802 cross-assembler running on IBM 360/370 mainframe computers.

== Experiments ==
=== Scalar Magnetometer ===
The scalar magnetometer had two dual-cell, cesium-vapor sensor heads whose output frequency was proportional to the total magnetic field. With this sensor configuration, only two small diamond-shaped dead zones existed. These lay along the orbit normal (the East-West direction) for the orbit and attitude chosen for this mission and a direction in which the magnetic field was never oriented. The scalar magnetometer's basic accuracy was on the order of 0.5 nT. A period count system converted the magnetometer output frequency to a digital word acceptable to the spacecraft telemetry system. This digital data had a resolution and accuracy of between 0.5 and 1.0 nT in the range 1.5E4 to 6.4E4 nT. Most of the time, noise on the spacecraft resulted in operation of only one sensor at a time. Eight total magnetic field strength measurements were obtained every second.

=== Vector Magnetometer ===
The vector magnetometer consisted of three fluxgate sensing elements aligned along orthogonal axes. The output of each vector sensor was converted to a digital word by an analog-to-digital converter. The outputs of all these axes were sampled essentially at the same time. Sixteen vectors were measured per second. Each vector measurement had a resolution of better than 1 nT and an absolute accuracy of better than 6 nT rms when referenced to a geocentric coordinate system. The measurement range was ± 6.4E4 nT.

== Critique ==
Magsat was not without problems. One of the biggest is that the motion of a metallic object tends to create a magnetic field. One study after the mission found a nonlinear fluxgate response when exposed to fields greater than 5000 mT. The applied field had to be transverse to the axis of the magnetometer. The design was improved by creating a feedback relay over a spherical design. This was the design used on later spacecraft, as the Ørsted satellite. This configuration magnetometer was also later used on the magnetometer of the Jupiter orbiter Juno, which arrived at the planet Jupiter in the 2010s.

== Atmospheric entry ==
The satellite decayed from orbit on 11 June 1980.

== See also ==
- Explorer program
