= Computer Resources International =

Danish aerospace and defense company

Computer Resources International (CRI) was a Danish aerospace and defense company, based in Birkerød, Denmark. In 1997 CRI was acquired by Terma A/S including subsidiaries in Italy, the Netherlands, and Germany.

CRI had 150 employees in the space department and 75 in defense. CRI had offices in Birkerød. CRI was owned by Unibank, BG Bank, and IBM.
