= Fields Avenue =

Fields Avenue may refer to:

- Fields Avenue, The Philippines
- Elysian Fields Avenue, Louisiana
