= Field (surname) =

Field is a surname. Notable people with the surname include:

- Alexander Field (disambiguation), several people of that name
- Amod Field (born 1967), American football player
- Andy Field (academic) (born 1973), professor of psychology at the University of Sussex
- Andy Field (blogger) (born 1983), British theatremaker, blogger, curator and academic
- Anthony Field (born 1963), Australian musician
- Ashley Field (born 1989), American basketball player
- Bradda Field (1893–1957), Canadian–British novelist
- Charles Field (disambiguation), several people of that name
- Clint Field (born 1983), American racing driver
- Cyrus West Field (1819–1892), American businessman and financier, responsible for the first Transatlantic Cable
- David Field (disambiguation), several people of that name
- Dick Field, Canadian politician
- Edward Field (1924–2026), American poet, novelist and memoirist
- Edwin Field (1872–1947), English rugby and cricket player
- Edwin Wilkins Field (1804–1871), English lawyer and painter
- E. J. Field, British neuroscientist
- Ernie Field (1943–2013), English boxer and rugby league player
- Eugene Field (1850–1895), American poet
- Francis Field (disambiguation), several people of that name
- Frank Field (disambiguation), several people of that name
- Frederick Field (disambiguation), several people of that name
- Hamilton Easter Field (1873–1922), artist, art patron, and critic
- Hartry Field (born 1946), philosopher at New York University
- James Field (disambiguation), several people of that name
- Jimmy Field (born 1940), Louisiana politician
- John Field (disambiguation), several people of that name
- Jon Field (born 1955), American racing driver
- Joshua Field (disambiguation), several people of that name
- Judith V. Field (born 1943), British historian of mathematics and art
- Lisa Field, American politician
- Lucia Field (born 2004), Australian singer and actress
- Marshall Field (disambiguation), several people of that name
- Martha Field (born 1943), academic and court clerk
- Martha R. Field (1856–1898), American newspaper reporter
- Mary Field (1909–1996), American actress
- Matt Field, British diplomat
- Michael Field (disambiguation), several people of that name
- Michel Field (born 1954), French journalist
- Nathan Field, (1587–1620), English dramatist and actor
- Noel Field, central character of several show trials in Eastern Europe during the 1950s
- Osmond F. Field, American college sports coach
- Oscar Wadsworth Field, American Medal of Honor recipient
- Paul Field (disambiguation), several people of that name
- Richard Field (disambiguation), several people of that name
- Robin Field, British composer (1935–2024)
- Roger Field (disambiguation), several people of that name
- Roswell Field (1807–1869), American lawyer, politician
- Roy Field (1932–2002), British special effects artist
- Sally Field, American actress
- Sam Field (1848–1904), American baseball player
- Sam Field (born 1998), English footballer
- Sid Field (1904–1950), English comedian
- Stephen Field (disambiguation), several people of that name
- Syd Field (1935–2013), American screenwriting guru
- Sylvia Field, American actress
- Thomas Field (disambiguation), several people of that name
- Tommy Field (born 1987), American baseball shortstop
- Todd Field, American film director
- The Field (musician), Axel Willner, a Swedish electronic musician
- William Field (disambiguation), several people of that name

== See also ==
- Fields (surname)
- Feild
