= Andy Field =

Andy Field may refer to:

- Andy Field (academic) (born 1973), professor for psychology at University of Sussex
- Andy Field (blogger) (born 1983), artist, blogger, curator and academic
