= Feil =

Feil is a surname of German origin. Notable people with the surname include:

- Arnold Feil (1925–2019), German musicologist
- Frederick Feil, American football player and coach
- Gerald Feil (May 1, 1933 – February 9, 2021), American cinematographer
- Jeffrey Feil (born 1978), President in CEO of The Feil Organization
- Naomi Feil (1932–2023), German-American gerontologist
- Peter Feil (25 March 1947 – 28 February 2017), Swedish swimmer
- Scott Feil (Born May 5, 1966), is an American medical
- Simon Feil, American actor

== Variants ==
- Feilde
- Feildel
- Feild
- Fielde
