= John Field =

John Field may refer to:

- John Field (American football) (1886–1979), American football player and coach
- John Field (brigadier) (1899–1974), Australian Army officer
- John Field (composer) (1782–1837), Irish composer
- John Field (dancer) (1921–1991), British dancer of the Royal Ballet
- John Field (Puritan) (1545–1588), British Puritan
- John Field (astronomer) (1520/30–1587), English astronomer
- John Field (songwriter) (born 1962), Australian songwriter and musician
- John A. Field Jr. (1910–1995), U.S. federal judge
- John Osbaldiston Field (1913–1985), governor of Saint Helena
- John Field (clothing), outdoor clothes for hunting
- John Collard Field (1822–1903), member of the Legislative Assembly of Ontario
- John Edwin Field (1936–2020), British physicist

== See also ==
- John Field Simms (1916–1975), U.S. politician from New Mexico
- John Field-Richards (1878–1959), British racer
- John Feild (disambiguation)
- John Fields (disambiguation)
- Jack Fields (disambiguation)
