= @ A. E. Harris =

Former theatre in Birmingham, England

Coordinates: 52.4850°N 1.9095°W

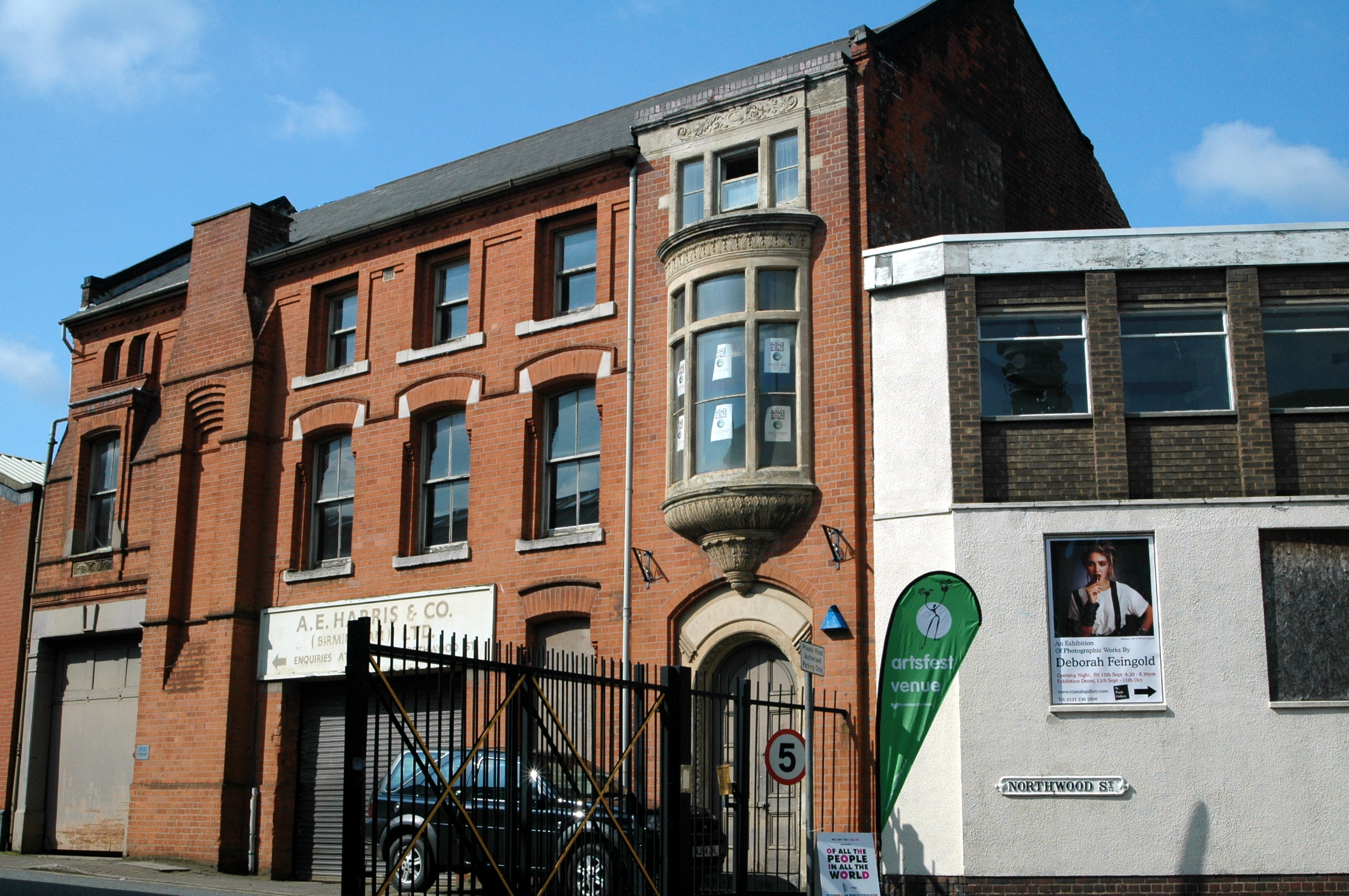
The venue in 2008, showing Of All The People In All The World

@ A. E. Harris was a theatre space located within the working metal fabricators' factory A E Harris, in the Jewellery Quarter of Birmingham, England. It was the home of the experimental Stan's Cafe theatre company.

The venue was established in 2008 by Stan's Cafe for their work Of All The People In All The World. The collaboration won an Arts & Business award in 2009, and in 2010, the company secured funding from the National Lottery to extend its lease and improve the venue's facilities. Over the following year performances by Birmingham Rep, the Birmingham Opera Company and Kindle Theatre were held in the space, as well as further performances by Stan's Cafe.

The venue originally hosted five performance spaces of varying sizes named after the five continents, but in 2013 economic expansion caused hosts A. E. Harris to take back the four largest to boost their manufacturing capacity, with the venue retaining Australia as a 50-seat performance space.

The site has now been redeveloped and the venue no longer exists. The manufacturing firm AE Harris and Co have moved to a new site in West Bromwich.
