= John Feild =

John Feild may refer to:

- John Feild (Puritan) (1545–1588), British Puritan clergyman and controversialist
- John Feild (proto-Copernican) (1520/1530–1587), English astronomer
- John Joseph Feild (born 1978), English actor, see JJ Feild

== See also ==
- John Field (disambiguation)
