= Chris Jordan (artist) =

American artist and photographer

Ben Franklin, a montage of 125,000 US $100 bills, the amount spent on the Iraq War every hour. 8.5 ft (2.6 m) wide by 10.5 ft (3.2 m) tall in three horizontal panels.

Chris Jordan (born 1963) is an American artist, photographer and film producer based in Seattle, Washington.

== Works ==
Many of Jordan's works are created from photographs of garbage and mass consumption, a technique which started when he visited an industrial yard to look at patterns of color and order. Jordan uses everyday commonalities such as a plastic cup, attempting to define the blind unawareness involved in American consumerism.

== Midway project ==
Midway: Message from the Gyre (2009–2013) is a series of photographs depicting rotting carcasses of baby Laysan albatrosses filled with plastic. These birds nest on Midway Atoll and are being fed plastic by their parents, who find floating plastic in the middle of the ocean and mistake it for food. This is a part of an ongoing arts and media project called Midway Journey, which has its own website.

== See also ==
- Of All The People In All The World – an art installation depicting similar statistics, using piles of rice
