= Wulfings =

Clan in the Norse sagas

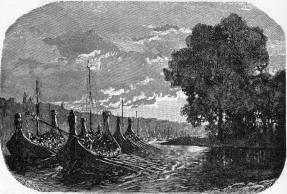
The Wulfing navy on the move, an illustration from the poems on the Wulfing Helgi Hundingsbane

The Wulfings, Wylfings or Ylfings (Note: Word initial w was lost before rounded vowels in Proto-Norse, e.g. wulf corresponds to ulf, and Wulfing/Wylfing corresponds to Ylfing, because the i in the second syllable causes an umlaut in the first syllable u->y.) (the name means the "wolf clan") was a powerful clan in Beowulf, Widsith and the Norse sagas. While the poet of Beowulf does not locate the Wulfings geographically, Scandinavian sources define the Ylfings (the Old Norse form of the name) as the ruling clan of the Eastern Geats.

The Wulfings play an important role in Beowulf as Beowulf's father Ecgþeow of the Wægmunding clan had slain one of its members, and was banished for not paying the weregild. The Danish king Hroðgar, who was married to Wealhþeow, a Wulfing woman, graciously paid the weregild, and when Beowulf arrived at the Danish court in order to slay Grendel, Hroðgar interpreted this as a son's gratitude.

In Old Norse sources, the clan figure prominently in the Heimskringla and in Sögubrot, where Hjörvard and his son Hjörmund belong to it. It is also mentioned in the Lay of Hyndla and in Skáldskaparmál where Eiríkr the Wise was one of its members. However, its most famous member was Helgi Hundingsbane who had two poems of his own (Helgakviða Hundingsbana I and Helgakviða Hundingsbana II), in the Poetic Edda, and whose story is also retold in the Völsunga saga.

Sam Newton and others (including Rupert Bruce-Mitford), have proposed that the East Anglian Wuffing dynasty was derived from the Wulfings, and it was at their court that Beowulf was first composed.

== Location ==
According to the Norse sagas, the Wulfings ruled the Geatish petty kingdom of Östergötland.

In the first poem (Helgakviða Hundingsbana I), Sinfjötli has his residence on the Brávellir (see Battle of the Brávellir). Stanza 42:

| Sinfiotli qvaþ: «Þv vart brvþr Grana a Bravelli, gvllbitlvþ vart gor til rasar; hafda ec þer moþri mart sceiþ riþit, svangri vnd sa/þli, simvl! forbergis.» | Sinfjotli quoth: "You were the bride of Grani the horse you were at Brávellir; harnessed with a golden bridle, and you were ready to run; I have ridden you tired downhill quite often, slim, as you were, under the saddle you fool!" |

Helgi Hundingsbane resides at Hringstaðir (probably modern Ringstad, an old royal estate on the same plain).

In the Heimskringla, Högni was the ruler of Östergötland. The legends of Helge Hundingsbane relate that Högni lost his throne to Helgi Hundingsbane. On the other hand, Sögubrot relates that Ivar Vidfamne gave the East Geatish throne to Hjörmund, the son of Hjörvard, after Ingjald's death since it had been the kingdom of Hjörmund's father Hjörvard.

Hann setti konunga ok jarla ok lét ser skatta gjalda; han setti Hjörmund konung, on Hervardar Ylfings, yfir Eystra-Gautland, er átt hafði faðir hans ok Granmarr konungr.

However, this contradicts both the legend of Helge Hundingsbane and the Heimskringla in which the dynasty never lost Östergötland, unless Ivar killed either Högne or Helgi Hundingsbane before giving the throne to their relative Hjörmund.

== Known Wulfings ==
- Ylfur or Úlfur, possible ancestor of the clan, based on clans being named after an ancestor.
- Helm Wulfingum ("Helm of the Wulfings"), mentioned in Widsith.
- Heaðolaf (Beowulf)
- Helgi Hundingsbane (Edda, Völsunga saga and Norna-Gests þáttr)
- Hjörvard Ylfing (e.g. Heimskringla and Sögubrot)
- Hjörmund (e.g. Heimskringla and Sögubrot)
- Högne (e.g. Heimskringla)
- Hildur, the son of Högne (e.g. Heimskringla)
- Eric the Wise (Skáldskaparmál and the Lay of Hyndla)
- Rikiwulf ("The rich and powerful wolf"), settled in Flanders in 876 near present Tielt, where he built Rikiwulfinga-haim.
- Wealhþeow, the queen of the Danish king Hroðgar, in Beowulf.

== See also ==
- Hundings
