= David Field (astrophysicist) =

British astrophysicist and author (born 1947)

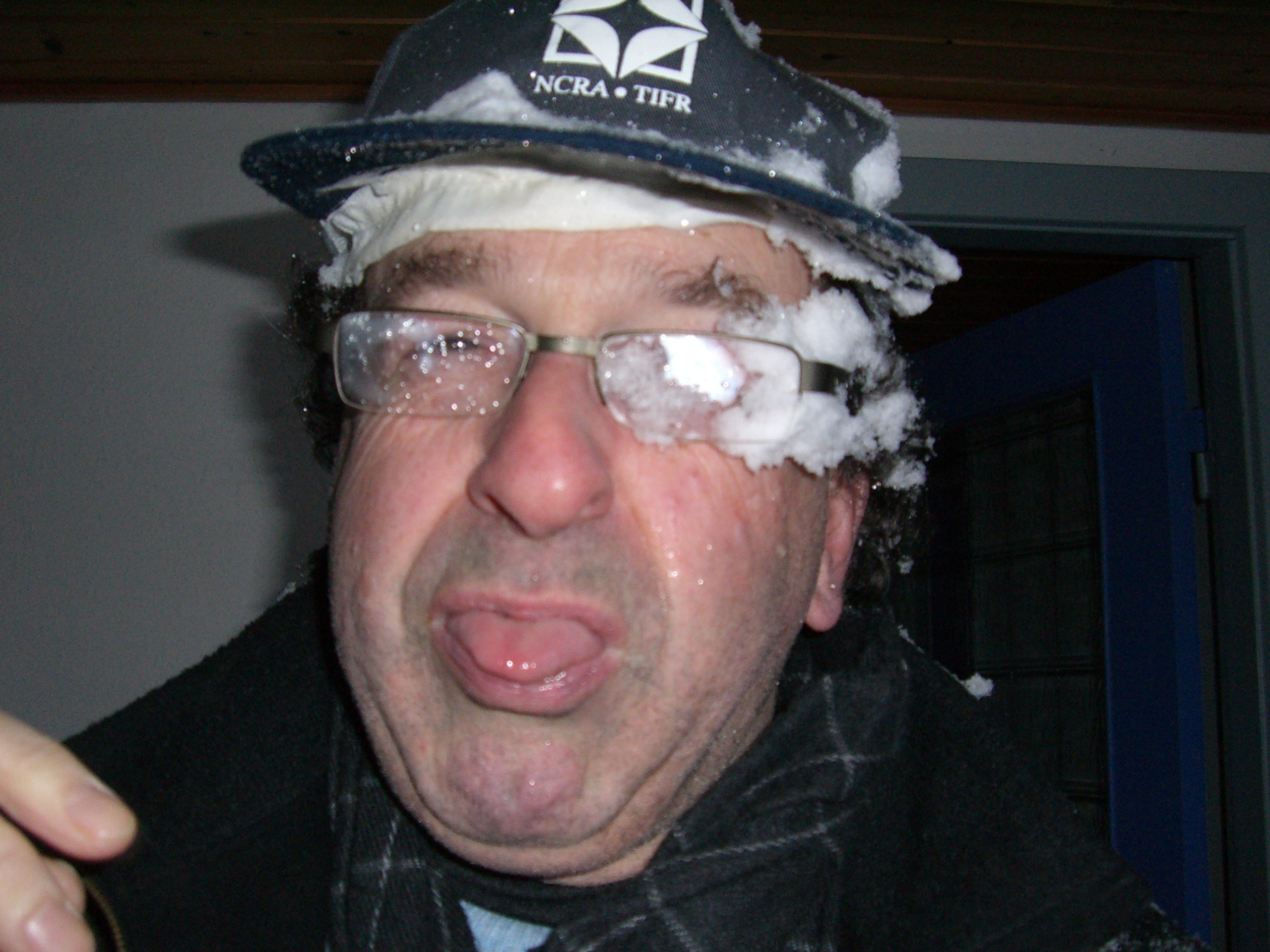
David Field

David Field (born 17 June 1947) is an astrophysicist and author, living in Århus, Denmark.

== Education ==
The son of E.J. and Dereen, Field studied Chemistry at Newcastle University, UK, followed by a PhD at the University of Cambridge. He was later awarded the degree of Doctor of Science by the University of Cambridge. Previously Reader in Physical Chemistry at the University of Bristol, he now researches astrophysics and experimental physics as a professor at the University of Aarhus. He has published over 175 papers in this subject. He is on the editorial board of Astrobiology, and played a key role in the discovery of spontelectrics.

== Authorship ==
Aside from academic work, Field is also known for his writing, being the author of a successful fiction series that begins with Friends and Enemies, and a second novel Beings in a Dream. The third and final volume in this trilogy, The Fairest Star, was published in November 2008.

== Scientific Publications ==
- H_{2} IR emission in OMC at high spatial resolution
- Imaging in Orion: NAOS-CONICA Adaptive Optics on the ESO-VLT
- Exploring new ways of making molecular hydrogen in space
- Elektrisk spænding opstår spontant i tyndfilm af lattergas
