= Feild =

Feild or Feilds is a surname. Notable people with the surname include:

- Edward Feild (1801–1876), Anglican bishop, university tutor and examiner, and inspector of schools
- John Feild (proto-Copernican) (1520–1587), English astronomer
- John Feild (Puritan) (1545–1588), British Puritan clergyman and controversialist
- JJ Feild (born 1978), English actor
- Lewis Feild, American professional cowboy and rodeo performer
- Maurice Feild (1905–1988), English painter and teacher
- Nathan Field (1587–1620), sometimes spelled Feild, English dramatist and actor
- Reshad Feild (1934–2016), English mystic, author, spiritual teacher, and musician
- Theophilus Feild (died 1636), Anglican bishop
- William A. Feilds (born c.1846–1852, died 1898), American legislator in the Tennessee House of Representatives

== See also ==
- Feilde
- Field (surname)
