= Kindle Theatre =

KILN (formerly known as Kindle Theatre) is a theatre company based in Birmingham, England. The company was founded in 2005 by Emily Ayres, Sam Fox, Jess Mackinnon and Olivia Winteringham, and is now run by three Artistic Directors and a Producer. The company halved in size from 8 members to 4 at Christmas 2005, and in 2006 launched a community arts project to produce a site-specific work in Smethwick's Chance Brothers glassworks. In 2011 the company was described as "one of the best emerging companies in the country" by Andy Field in The Guardian, and in 2013 the company was appointed as an associate company of Birmingham Rep.
