= Tielt =

- City and municipality
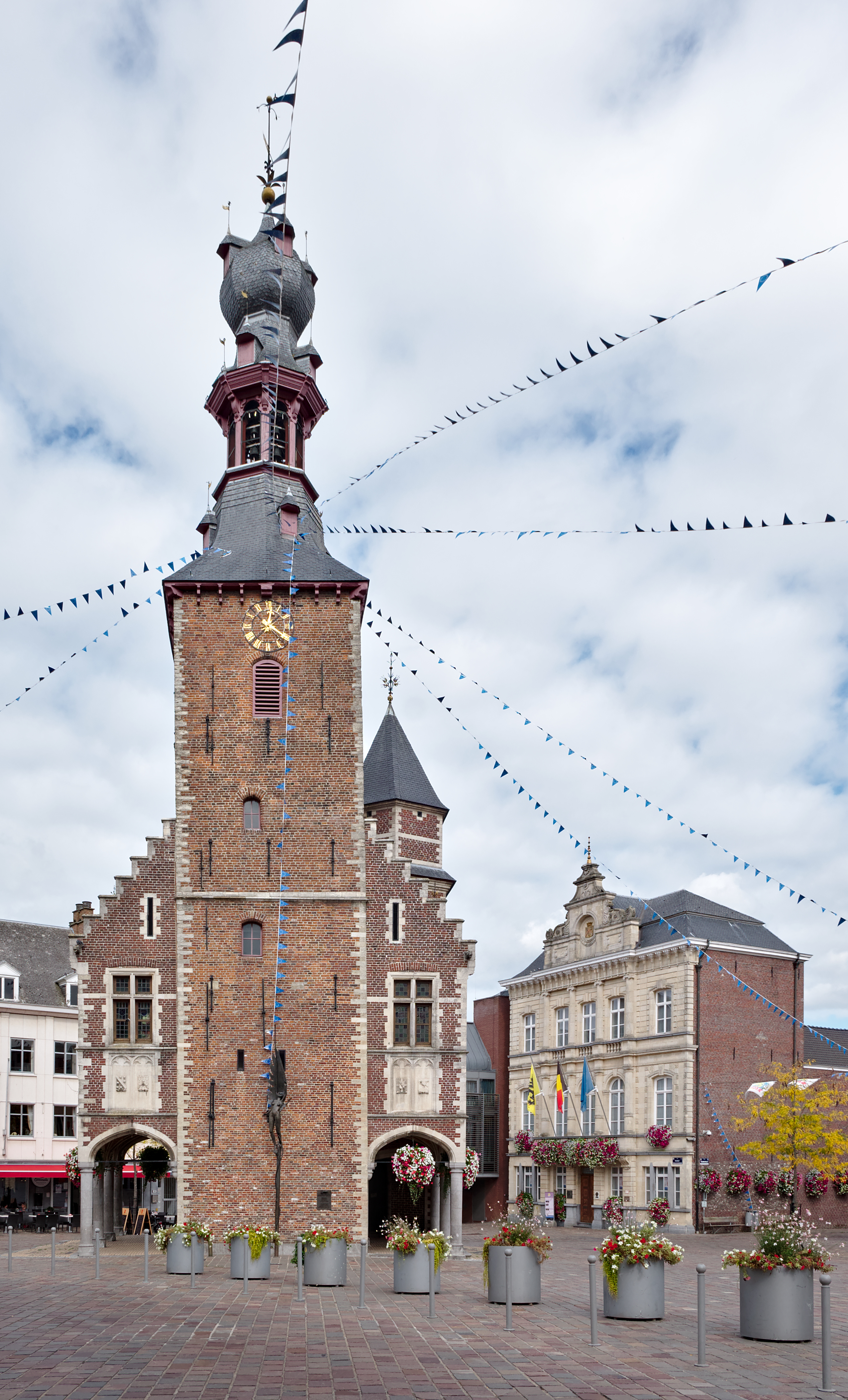
- Belfry of Tielt and town hall

- Flag Coat of arms

- Location of Tielt in West Flanders
- Interactive map of Tielt
- Location in Belgium
- Coordinates: 51°00′0.849″N 03°19′35.055″E
- Country: Belgium
- Community: Flemish Community
- Region: Flemish Region
- Province: West Flanders
- Arrondissement: Tielt

Government
  - Mayor: Luc Vannieuwenhuyze (CD&V)
  - Governing parties: CD&V, Iedereen Tielt

Population (2022-01-01)
  - Total: 20,500
- Postal codes: 8700
- NIS code: 37015
- Area codes: 051
- Website: www.tielt.be

Tielt (Dutch pronunciation: [tilt]; French: Thielt) is a Belgian city and municipality in the province of West Flanders. The municipality comprises the town of Tielt proper and the villages of Aarsele, Kanegem, and Schuiferskapelle.

== History ==
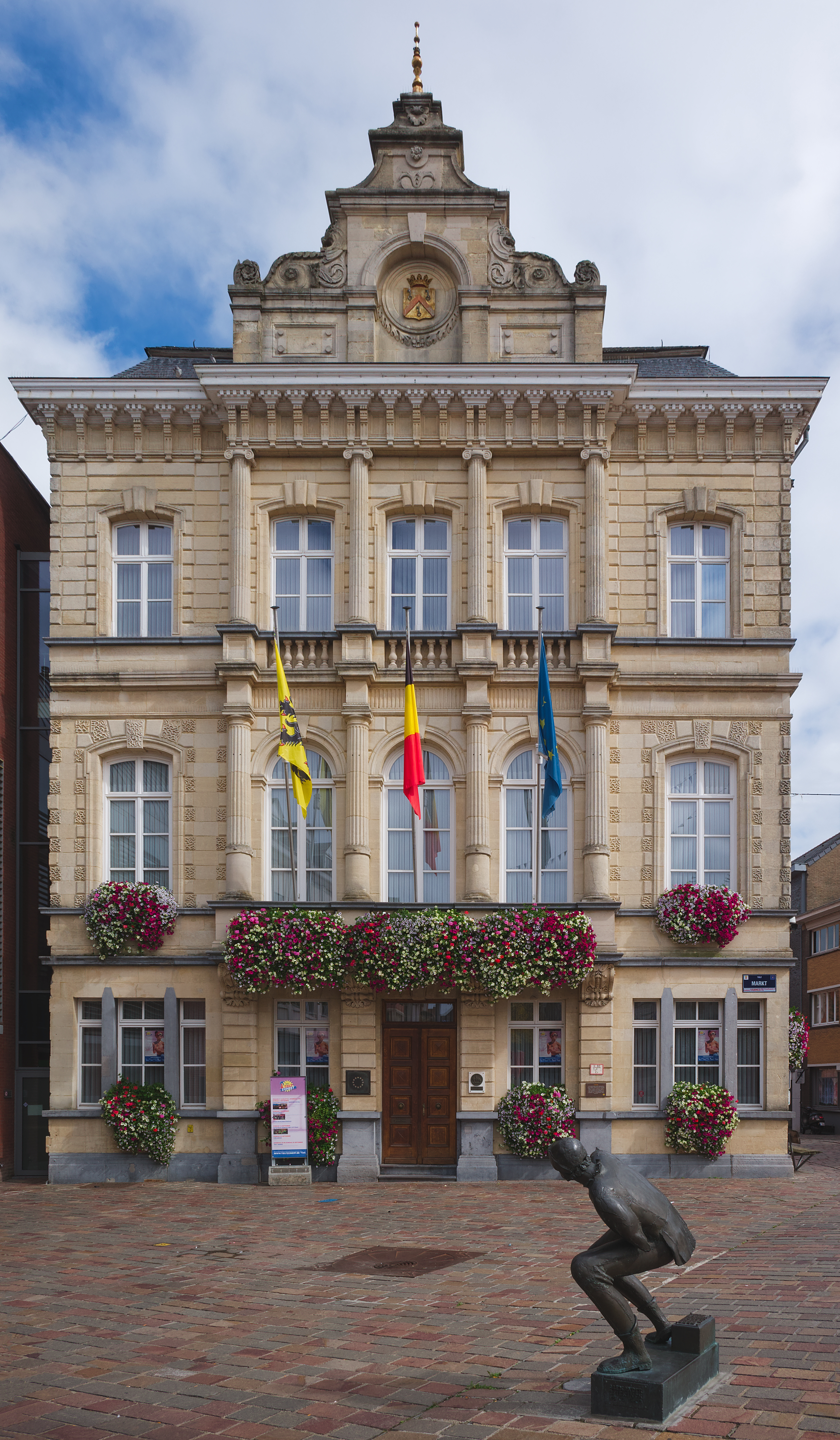
Townhall of Tielt

Some traces of Gallo-Roman occupation have been found in this area. The region was invaded by the Viking Rikiwulf of the Wulfing dynasty in 880 AD, who built Rikiwulfinga-haim, which survives as the Rijkegem-kouter today. The first written mention of Tiletum, dates from 1105, when Baldric of Noyon, Bishop of Tournai, awarded the right of presentment for the parish church to the chapter of St Salvator in Harelbeke. In 1245, Margaret of Constantinople, Countess of Flanders gave the city its charter and decided to found a hospital here. A few years later, a market place and cloth hall were built as well. Like neighbouring Roeselare, Tielt was made part of the Kortrijk province of Flanders. In the 13th and 14th century, the economy of most Flemish cities was based on the cloth industry, while the rural areas lived on the products of agriculture.

In 1393, Philip the Bold decided to hold an annual fair in Tielt, which resulted in the city becoming the booming centre of the flax industry until the end of the 16th century. The following decades, however, were hard on Tielt as it suffered two major fires and a couple of epidemics, including the plague. Tielt also went through a severe famine at the end of the 17th century. From about 1700 until the Belgian Revolution of 1830, the city prospered again, this time as a regional center for the construction industry.

During World War I, the city became the headquarters for the German army. The bombing of the Second World War was a lot more destructive. Most of the city centre had to be rebuilt. Today Tielt is a typical province town, which offers commercial, medical and educational services to the surrounding region.

== Economy ==
Industries:

- Seyntex, textile manufacturer
- Mitsubishi Chemical Advanced Materials
- Balta Tielt

Media:

- Lannoo, publishing group

== Sights ==
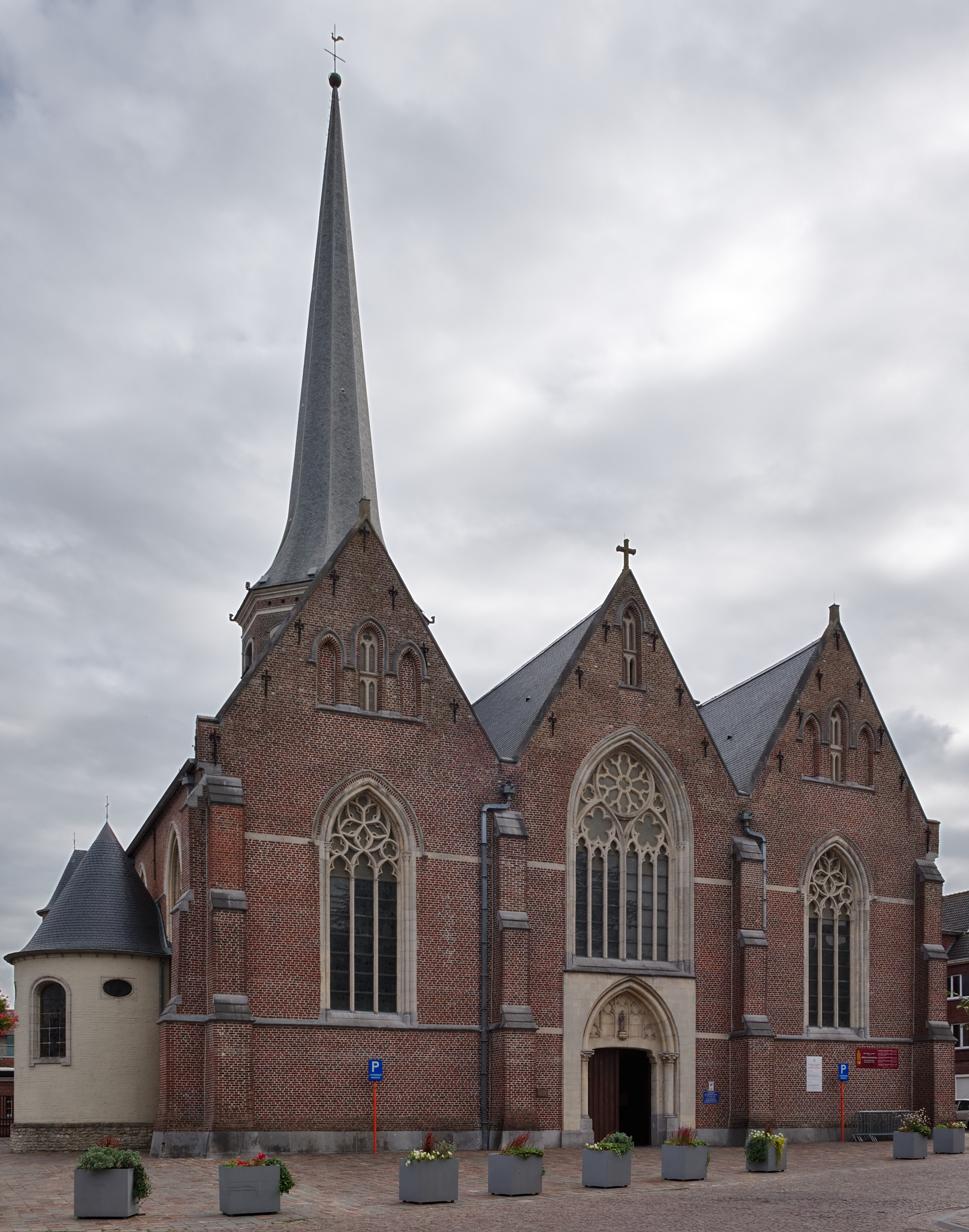
Sint-Pieterskerk

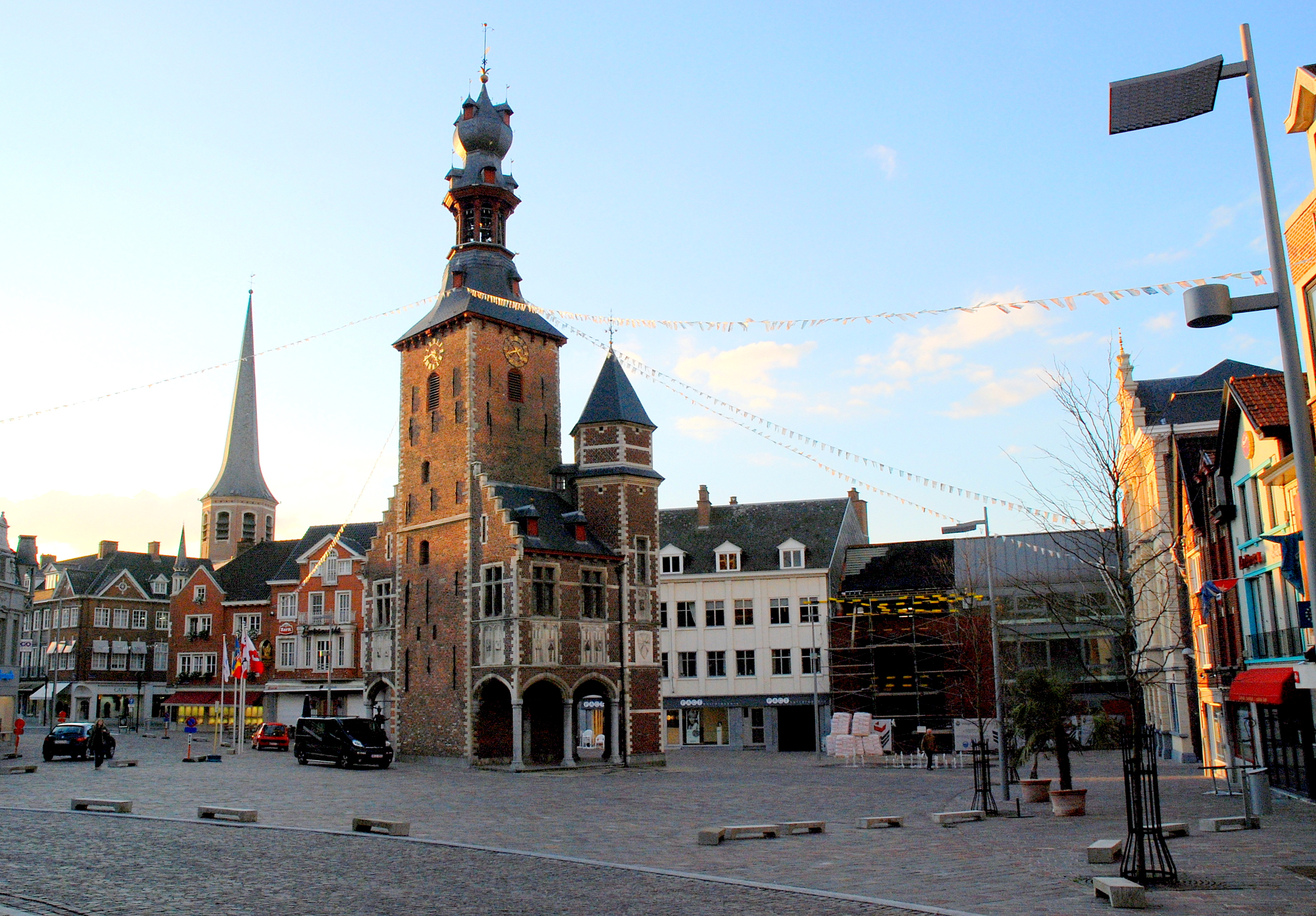
Market square and Halletoren

- The Belfry (Hallentoren), Cloth Hall, and Aldermen's Chamber are classified by UNESCO as a World Heritage Site because of their architecture and civic importance in the Middle Ages, Renaissance, and Baroque periods.
- The city also houses some interesting churches such as Saint-Peter's.
- From Tielt, there are several strolling and biking paths that allow the visitor to discover the region and see some of the windmills that still dot the landscape.

== Festivities ==
Every year, on the first week-end of July, the city celebrates the Europafeesten (feast of Europe). This is the occasion for a braderie (a street clearance sale), street theatre, a blues festival, fireworks and expanded café terraces for further merriment.

== People born in Tielt ==
- Olivier Le Daim, originally de Neckere a 15th-century barber and valet to Louis XI, known in France as Olivier le Mauvais
- Josse Ravesteyn, 16th-century theologian
- Godfried Danneels, cardinal in the Roman Catholic Church
- Briek Schotte, two-time World Champion cyclist
- Gianni Meersman, professional road racing cyclist
- Enzo Ide, racing driver
- Kurt Martens, professor and canon lawyer

== International relations ==
=== Twin towns — Sister cities ===
Tielt is twinned with:

Groß-Gerau, Germany; Bruneck, Italy	Brignoles, France; Szamotuły, Poland
