= Frederick Fields =

Frederick Fields may refer to:

- Freddie Fields (1923–2007), American theatrical agent and film director
- Fred Fields, American artist

== See also ==
- Frederick Field (disambiguation)
