= The Jurist (journal) =

- Discipline: Canon law
- Language: English
- Edited by: William L. Daniel

Publication details
- History: 1941-present
- Publisher: The Catholic University of America Press (United States)
- Frequency: Biannual

Standard abbreviations
- ISO 4: Jurist

Indexing
- ISSN: 0022-6858

Links
- Journal homepage

The Jurist: Studies in Church Law and Ministry or simply The Jurist is a peer-reviewed academic journal and the only journal published in the United States devoted to the study and promotion of the canon law of the Catholic Church. It was initiated in 1940 to serve the academic and professional needs of Catholic church lawyers. It originally focused on the canon law of the Latin Church, but came to include Eastern Catholic canon law as well.

== History ==
The first issue appeared on January 6, 1941. Initial responses to the journal were favorable, as it was declared "We applaud its present performance and while we look forward to the improvement which its initial effort promises and which maturity will bring" and "the first issues warrant the belief that the scholars of the United States will make valuable contributions to the study of Canon Law".

Until 1976, the journal was a quarterly publication, but since then it has been issued twice yearly; beginning with volume 71, the journal has been published by The Catholic University of America Press for the School of Canon Law. The editorial board consists of the faculty of the School of Canon Law at The Catholic University of America in Washington, D.C., the only such school in the United States. The journal is published in print and online at Project MUSE.

== Scope ==
Initially the journal focused largely on issues of Latin church law both in terms of its history, medieval and modern, and contemporary practice. However, within the past few decades since the Second Vatican Council, it has broadened its horizons and audience. For it also explores questions of interest to theologians, Eastern Catholic church lawyers, civil lawyers, diocesan planners and diocesan finance and personnel officials. Recent issues have contained the decisions of the Apostolic Signatura in Latin and English translation.

== Editors ==
Previous editors included Jerome Daniel Hannan, Frederick R. McManus (1959-1989), James H. Provost, Thomas J. Green, and Kurt Martens. The current editor is William L. Daniel.
