= Josh Fields =

Josh Fields is the name of:

- Josh Fields (infielder) (born 1982), player in the Philadelphia Phillies organization
- Josh Fields (pitcher) (born 1985), relief pitcher for the Los Angeles Dodgers

== See also ==
- Joshua Field (disambiguation)
