= David Field =

David Field may refer to:

== People ==
- David Field (actor) (born 1961), Australian actor
- David Field (astrophysicist) (born 1947), astrophysicist and author
- David Dudley Field I (1781–1867), American Congregational clergyman and historical writer
- David Dudley Field II (1805–1894), American lawyer and law reformer

== Transportation ==
- Enrique Malek International Airport, Panama, known as David Field during World War II

== See also ==
- David Field Beatty, 2nd Earl Beatty
