= Kurt Martens =

Belgian professor and canon lawyer (born 1973)

Kurt Martens (born 31 March 1973) is a Belgian professor and canon lawyer.

== Biography ==
Martens was born in Tielt, West Flanders. He studied as a secondary school student at the Sint-Jozefscollege in Tielt.

Later as a student at the Catholic University of Louvain, he obtained a civil law degree (1996), licentiate degree in canon law (1997), and earned his doctorate in canon law (2004). During his student years he was president of the faculty circle Canonica for the 1996-1997 academic year, and worked as a research assistant at the Special Faculty of Canon Law of the Catholic University of Louvain until 2005.

In 2003 he was a visiting professor at the Institut de Droit Canonique of the Université Marc Bloch in Strasbourg, France.

Starting with the 2005–2006 academic year, Martens has been a member of the faculty of the School of Canon Law at The Catholic University of America in Washington, D.C. He received the Young Faculty Research Award from the university in 2009, and was promoted to ordinary professor in 2015.

He was appointed a counselor to the Committee on Canonical Affairs and Church Governance of the United States Conference of Catholic Bishops in 2008. In 2022, he was appointed a member of the National Review Board.

Martens has served as editor-in-chief of the scientific journal The Jurist: Studies in Church Law and Ministry since 2012. He was also the co-founder and co-editor-in-chief of the journal Recht, Religie en Samenleving (Law, Religion and Society).

He is an expert in religious liberty/church-state relations, papal elections, the Roman Curia, the canonical processes of hierarchical recourse, and the hierarchical structures of the Church (such as episcopal conferences, diocesan structures, and curias).

== Publications ==
- The Pope and His Entourage (Leuven: Davidsfond, 2003)
- Habemus Papam, Het Profiel van de Volgende Paus, written with Rik Torfs [Habemus Papam, The Profile of the Next Pope] (Leuven: Davidsfond, 2004; ISBN 90-5826-268-5)
- Van Ratzinger tot Benedictus XVI [From Ratzinger to Benedict XVI] (2005)
- Legal Protection in the Church [Rechtsbescherming in de Kerk; Ontwikkeling en aanwending van rechtsmiddelen tegen overheidsbeslissingen in de rooms-katholieke Kerk] (2007)
- Handboek Erediensten – Bestuur en organisatie, written with Frank Judo [Worship Manual: Administration and Organization] (2010)
- Justice and Mercy Have Met: Pope Francis and the Reform of the Marriage Nullity Process (Washington, DC: CUA Press, 2017; ISBN 978-0-8132-2967-6)
- A Service Beyond All Recompense: Essays in Honor of Monsignor Thomas J. Green (Washington, DC: CUA Press, 2018; ISBN 978-0-8132-3014-6)
