= James Fields =

James Fields may refer to:

- James A. Fields (1844–1903), prominent lawyer and member of the Virginia House of Delegates
  - James A. Fields House, a historic home located in the Brookville Heights neighborhood of Newport News, Virginia
- James Alex Fields Jr. (born 1997), convicted perpetrator of the 2017 Charlottesville car attack
- James B. Fields (1850–1896), Baptist preacher and orator
- James C. Fields, American civil servant, member of the Alabama House of Representatives, and minister in the United Methodist Church
- James H. Fields (1920–1970), a United States Army captain and recipient of the Medal of Honor
- James Henry Fields (c. 1948–1984), American pianist
- James L. Fields, American sound engineer
- James T. Fields (1817–1881), American publisher, editor, and poet
- Jim Fields (born 1958), American film director, producer, playwright and actor

== See also ==
- James Field (disambiguation)
