= Fields (surname) =

Fields is a surname. Notable people with the surname include:

== Arts and entertainment ==
- A. Roland Fields (1884–?) (also known as Al Fields), American art director
- Bradley Fields (1951–2020), American magician
- Brandon Fields (musician), American musician
- Danny Fields (born 1939), American music manager, publicist, journalist, and author born Daniel Feinberg
- Dorothy Fields (1904–1974), American librettist and lyricist
- Frank Fields (1914–2005), American musician
- Fred Fields, American game artist
- Freddie Fields (1923–2007), American theatrical agent and film director born Fred Feldman
- Gracie Fields (1898–1979), British actress, singer, and comedian
- Joseph Fields (1895–1966), American playwright, theatre director, screenwriter, and film producer
- Kim Fields (born 1969), American actress and director
- Lew Fields (1867–1941), American actor, comedian, vaudeville star, theatre manager, and producer born Moses Schoenfeld
- Leslie Fields-Cruz, American journalist
- Tony Fields (1958–1995), American dancer
- Totie Fields (1930–1978), American comedian
- W. C. Fields (1880–1946), American comedian, actor, juggler, and writer born William Claude Dukenfield

== Business ==
- Dana Leslie Fields, American magazine publisher, inaugural inductee into the magazine hall of fame
- Debbi Fields (born 1956), founder and spokesperson of Mrs. Fields Bakeries
- Mark Fields (businessman) (born 1961), president and CEO of Ford Motor Company
- Vina Fields, 19th-century brothel owner

== Politics ==
- Cierra Fields (born 1999) is a Native American community health activist
- Cleo Fields (born 1962), American politician
- Jack Fields (born 1952), American politician and businessman
- T. T. Fields (1912–1994), American politician who served in the Louisiana House (1952–1972)
- Thomas C. Fields (1825–1885), New York politician and state senator
- William Fields (politician) (1810–1854), American politician who served in the Texas House
- William J. Fields (1874–1954), Governor of Kentucky (1923–1927)

== Religion ==
- Harvey J. Fields (1935–2014), American Reform rabbi
- Wilmer Clemont Fields (1922–2018), American Southern Baptist minister

== Science, mathematics and academia ==
- Barbara J. Fields (born 1947), American professor of American history
- Bernard N. Fields (1938–1995), American microbiologist, virologist and member of the National Academy of Sciences
- Edda L. Fields-Black, née Fields, African-American historian
- John Charles Fields (1863–1932), Canadian mathematician and founder of the Fields Medal
- Rona M. Fields (1932–2016), American psychologist, feminist and author

== Sports ==
- Benn Fields (born 1954), American high jumper
- Brandon Fields (American football) (born 1984), American National Football League player
- DaMarcus Fields (born 1998), American football player
- Dwayne Fields (fl. 2010–), Jamaican-British explorer and Chief Scout
- Horatio Fields (born 2002), American football player
- Jackie Fields (1908–1987), American boxer, twice world welterweight champion
- Josh Fields (infielder) (born 1982), American former Major League Baseball player
- Josh Fields (pitcher) (born 1985), American Major League Baseball player
- Justin Fields (born 1999), American football player
- Kenny Fields (born 1962), American National Basketball Association player
- Landry Fields (born 1988), American National Basketball Association executive and former player
- Malachi Fields (born 2003), American National Football League player
- Mark Fields (cornerback) (born 1996), American football player
- Mark Fields (linebacker) (born 1972), American National Football League player
- Rodney Fields Jr. (born 2004), American football player
- Roemon Fields (born 1990), American baseball player
- Shay Fields (born 1996), American football player
- Tony Fields II (born 1999), American National Football League player

== Other ==
- Mary Fields (c. 1832–1914) American mail carrier
- Rich Fields (born 1960), American broadcaster, spokesman, announcer, and meteorologist
- Donald Eugene Fields II (born 1964), American fugitive currently on the FBI Ten Most Wanted Fugitives list

== See also ==
- Field (surname)
