= Frederick Field =

Frederick Field may refer to:

- Frederick Field (chemist) (1826–1885), English chemist
- Frederick Field (theologian) (1801–1885), English theologian and biblical scholar
- Frederick Field (Royal Navy officer) (1871–1945), British Admiral of the Fleet
- Frederick Vanderbilt Field (1905–2000), American communist
- Fred Tarbell Field (1876–1950), chief justice of the Massachusetts Supreme Judicial Court
- Ted Field (born Frederick Field, 1953), American media mogul

== See also ==
- Frederick Fields (disambiguation)
- Fred Field (disambiguation)
