= Stephen Field =

Stephen Field may refer to:

- Stephen Johnson Field (1816–1899), United States Supreme Court justice
- Stephen L. Field, American literary scholar, academic and author
- Steve Field (doctor) (born 1959), British medical professor
- Steve Field (sculptor) (born 1954), English sculptor, muralist and mosaicist
- Steve Field, actor in Blonde Dolly

== See also ==
- Stephen Fields (1879–1949), American tug-of-war Olympian
