= Alexander Field =

Alexander Field may refer to:

People

- Alexander Field (actor) (1892–1971), English actor
- Alexander Pope Field (1800–1876), American politician
- Alex Field (born 1986), American football player

Places

- Alexander Field (Blythe, California), a baseball venue in Blythe, California, United States
- Alexander Field (Purdue University), a baseball venue in West Lafayette, Indiana, United States
- South Wood County Airport, also known as Alexander Field
