= Erquinghem-Lys =

- Commune
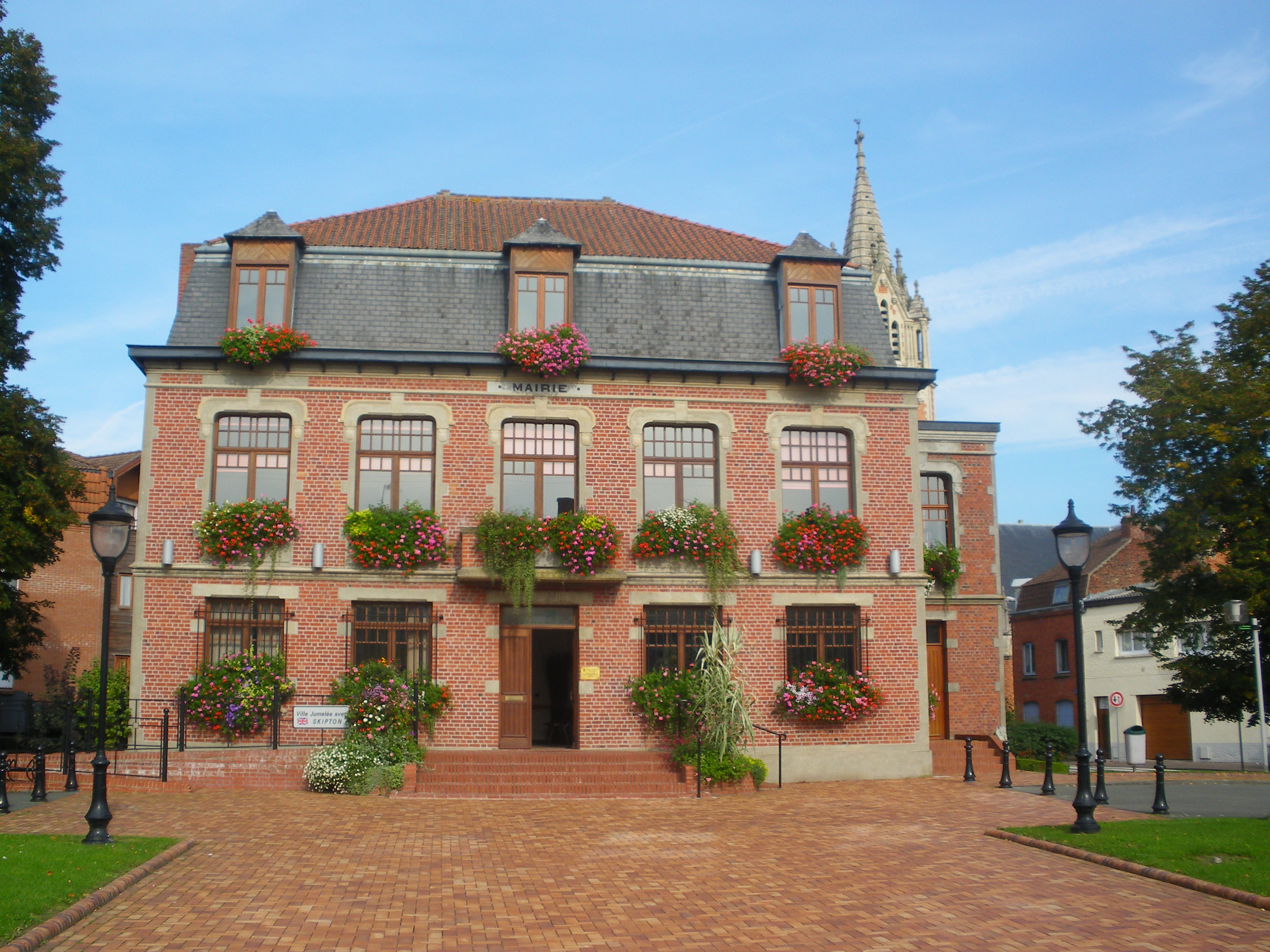
- The town hall in Erquinghem-Lys

- Coat of arms
- Location of Erquinghem-Lys
- Location within France Location within Hauts-de-France
- Coordinates: 50°40′34″N 2°50′54″E
- Country: France
- Region: Hauts-de-France
- Department: Nord
- Arrondissement: Lille
- Canton: Armentières
- Intercommunality: Métropole Européenne de Lille

Government
  - Mayor (2020–2026): Alain Bézirard
- Area^{1}: 8.94 km^{2} (3.45 sq mi)
- Elevation: 18 m (59 ft)
- Highest elevation: 20 m (66 ft)
- Lowest elevation: 12 m (39 ft)
- Population (2023): 5,341
  - Density: 597/km^{2} (1,550/sq mi)
- Time zone: UTC+01:00 (CET)
  - Summer (DST): UTC+02:00 (CEST)
- INSEE/Postal code: 59202 /59193
- ^{1} French Land Register data, which excludes lakes, ponds, glaciers > 1 km^{2} (0.386 sq mi or 247 acres) and river estuaries.

Erquinghem-Lys (French pronunciation: [ɛʁkɛ̃ɡɛm lis]) (Erkegem an de Leie in West Flemish) is a commune situated in the Nord department in northern France.

It is part of the Métropole Européenne de Lille. Erquinghem is one of a series of villages on the river Lys established by the Viking Rikiwulf in 880 AD at the time of the invasion led by Godfrid, Duke of Frisia: Racquinghem, Reclinghem, Rekkem and Rijkegem (the latter two now in West Flanders – Belgium).

Erquinghem-Lys has been twinned with Skipton, North Yorkshire, England since 24 October 2009.

== Population ==
Historical population
Year	Pop.	±% p.a.
1968	3,456	—
1975	3,658	+0.81%
1982	3,949	+1.10%
1990	4,355	+1.23%
1999	4,495	+0.35%
2007	4,509	+0.04%
2012	4,734	+0.98%
2017	5,158	+1.73%
2023	5,341	+0.58%
Source: INSEE

== Heraldry ==
Arms of Erquinghem-Lys	The arms of Erquinghem-Lys are blazoned : Or, a lion sable, overall a bend componey argent and gules.

== See also ==
- Communes of the Nord department
