= John Fields =

John Fields may refer to:

- John Fields (basketball) (born 1988)
- John Fields (record producer) (born 1968)
- John Fields, Australian adventurer and filmmaker, starred in World Safari with Alby Mangels
- John Charles Fields (1863–1932), Canadian mathematician

== See also ==
- Jack Fields (disambiguation)
- John Field (disambiguation)
