= Michael Field =

Michael Field may refer to:

- Michael Field (politician) (born 1948), Premier of Tasmania
- Michael Field (author), pseudonym of Katherine Bradley and Edith Cooper
- Michael Field (physician) (1933–2014), American gastroenterologist
- Michael Field (food writer) (1915–1971) American author and critic

== See also ==
- Michael Fields, American TV director, writer and producer
- Michel Field (born 1954), French journalist
