= William Fields =

William Fields may refer to:

- William J. Fields, U.S. Representative and Governor of Kentucky
- William M. Fields, American qualitative investigator studying language, culture, and tools in non-human primates
- William Fields (rower), American rower and Olympic gold medalist
- William C. Fields (1804–1882), U.S. Representative from New York
- William A. Feilds (died 1898), American legislator in the Tennessee House of Representatives
- William Fields (politician) (~1810–1858), a Texan politician and author from North Carolina
- William Fields (Canadian football), a former professional Canadian football player and current coach

== See also ==
- William Field (disambiguation)
