= Richard Fields =

Richard Fields may refer to:

- Richard Fields (All My Children), a fictional character on All My Children
- Rich Fields (born 1960), American broadcaster
- Richard "Dimples" Fields (1942–2000), American singer
- Richard Fields (Cherokee chief), Cherokee leader

== See also ==
- Richard Field (disambiguation)
