= Deborah Pearson =

Canadian playwright and performer (born 1983)

Deborah Pearson is a British, Hungarian and Canadian live artist, playwright, director, performer, librettist and curator based in London, U.K. and born in Toronto, Canada. She holds a practice-based PhD in narrative in contemporary performance from Royal Holloway, University of London, where she was a Reid Scholar. Her dissertation was supervised by playwright Dan Rebellato.

== Biography ==
Her work has been performed on six continents and in over twenty countries, and translated into six languages. Her pieces and collaborations have been shown in a variety of contexts including visual art galleries the Tate Exchange, Brussels Nuit Blanche, Somerset House and the Fruitmarket Gallery in Edinburgh, theatres including the Royal Court Theatre in London, Teatro Nacional Donna Maria II in Lisbon and Théâtre Garonne in France, and film festivals including the Edinburgh International Film Festival, the Flatpack Film Festival in Birmingham and the Vancouver International Film Festival.

Her work is frequently commissioned and shown in Portugal where she has worked with Culturgest, Teatro Nacional Donna Maria II, Teatro do Bairro Alto, mala voadora and Ricardo Correia. In 2017 her show History History History at Culturgest was named in the national Portuguese newspaper Publico as one of the top ten performances of the year. In 2023 her play Baby Steps about giving birth during lockdown was awarded best translation for Fernando Ricardo Coelho by Eurodram, the European Network for Drama in Translation. Her work in Portugal is frequently translated by Francisco Frazao.

In a Q and A she called herself a "conceptual artist who works with performance."

== Forest Fringe ==
She is founder and co-director of Forest Fringe with fellow theatre makers Andy Field and Ira Brand, winner of the 2009 Peter Brook Empty Space Award, a Fringe First and three Herald Angels. In 2010 she won a Herald Angel for her solo show Like You Were Before at the Edinburgh Fringe and was shortlisted for the Total Theatre Award for Innovation and the Arches Brick Award. In 2010 and 2016 she was listed as one of the 100 most influential people in UK theatre along with Forest Fringe co-director Andy Field.

She was a resident artist for two years at Somerset House Studios with Caroline Williams and an associate artist at Somerset House Studios with Forest Fringe. In 2019, Forest Fringe created "The Amateurs Club," a free film school at Somerset House, which culminated in the group shooting the collaborative made feature film "Dream Agency" which was co-directed by Pearson and Andy Field. "Dream Agency" had its world premiere at the Edinburgh International Film Festival in 2022.

== Performance Installations ==
- The Filibuster In collaboration with Dr. Anna Snaith. Recipient of the Somerset House and King's College London Arts and Society Award. 2 September, 2017 at Somerset House, London and 29 March, 2019 at Conde Duque, Madrid.
- Make Yourself At Home Conceived by Deborah Pearson. Created in collaboration with Caroline Williams and Gary Campbell. 1 October, 2016 at Nuit Blanche in the European Quarter, Brussels.
- Drifting Right Commissioned by the Next Wave Festival, Australia. Presented in April, 2014 at Next Wave and the Wheeler Centre, Melbourne and March, 2015 at the (Im)Possible Futures Festival and Conference at Vooruit, Ghent.

== Plays ==
- The Talent In collaboration with Action Hero. Commissioned by Teatro do Bairro Alto, Lisbon. 3-20 May, 2023 at Battersea Arts Centre, London and UK National Tour.
- Mon€y Directed by Jorge Andrade. Commissioned by mala voadora and Teatro Donna Maria II, Lisbon. 17 October - 3 November, 2019 at teatro mala voadora, Porto and Teatro Donna Maria II, Lisbon.
- Inside Bitch Co-conceived, co-written and co-directed with Stacey Gregg. Devised with and performed by Jade Small, Jennifer Joseph, TerriAnn Oudjar and Lucy Edkins. Commissioned by Clean Break and the Royal Court. 27 February - 23 March, 2019 at the Royal Court, London.
- It's All Made Up Directed by Lucy Morrison. Commissioned by Chloe Lamford as part of The Site season at the Royal Court. 24 - 26 May, 2017 at the Royal Court, London.
- History History History Dramaturgy by Tania El Khoury, Laura Dannequin and Daniel Kitson. Commissioned by bit teatergarasjen, Norway, and Théâtre Garronne, France. International touring between 2016 and 2019 to Norway, France, Spain, Portugal, Slovenia, Czech Republic, Estonia, Greece, U.K., Canada, China and Australia.
- The Future Show, Written and performed by Deborah Pearson. 7 April 2012 at the Basement; 20 April 2012 at the Gate; 10–12 January 2013 at BAC. International touring between 2013 and 2016 to Ireland, USA, Canada, Belgium, Poland, and Portugal
- The Queen West Project In collaboration with Allison Cummings. 12–23 September 2012 in the Theatre Beyond Walls season at Theatre Passe Muraille, Toronto
- A Synonym for Love, Libretto by Deborah Pearson, music by Handel, Directed by Ross Manson. 20–31 August 2012 at the Gladstone Hotel, Toronto
  - Indiscreet, Written and performed by Deborah Pearson with Eleanor Buchan, Caroline Williams and Rea Mole. 29 March - 20 April 2011 at BAC
- Like You Were Before, Written and performed by Deborah Pearson. April 2010 at BAC; Edinburgh Festival 2010; The Junction, STK Airport, PAC, Arnolfini, Broadway Cinema 2011; Culturgest Lisboa 2012

== Podcasts ==
- The Future Show Coventry 2020 Co-created with Andy Smith, Ira Brand, Claire Doherty, and Coventry Young Writers. A large scale participatory audio version of The Future Show, written and performed during the pandemic by 12 young writers from Coventry. Commissioned by the Situations Festival and Coventry 2020, UK City of Culture. Published in June, 2020.
- The Whole Darned Thing An eight part interview podcast where guests including Brian Lobel, Season Butler, Tania El Khoury and Hamja Ahsan told Deborah Pearson the entire plot of something they'd seen or read.
- The Brain in collaboration with Paul Broks. Produced by Fuel Theatre as part of the "Bodypods" series. 12 April 2012.

== Films ==
- Dream Agency Co-directed with Andy Field and co-written with 16 artists from Forest Fringe. Produced by Art House Jersey and Forest Fringe. Premiered August 2022 at the Edinburgh International Film Festival

== Notable publications ==
Her shows The Future Show and Inside Bitch are both published with Oberon books, The Elders ("Os Anciãos") is published in the collection "Palcos Novas Palavros Novas" in Portuguese by Panos and Baby Steps is published in the collection "Pecas breves sobre a ascensao e queda de uma egoista chamada Europa" in Portuguese by Edicoes Humus.

== Canadian Work ==
She is an associate artist with Volcano Theatre in Canada, running their creation lab InForming Content from 2008 to 2019. InForming Content is described as "a free three-day creation lab combining experimental approaches to theatre-making with expert academic presentations on a theme of current global concern." The lab took place at the University of Toronto's Centre for Ethics, at the University of Toronto's Jackman Humanities Institute, at the Theatre Centre and at Queen's University, Canada. Past participating artists include Jacob Wren, Nadia Ross, Ravi Jain, Marjorie Chan, Heidi Strauss, David Yee and Weyni Mengesha. Past participating scholars include Lee Smolin and Mark Kingwell.

With Ross Manson and Kate Alton, Deborah wrote and co-directed "Post National" in collaboration with York University students in 2017. "Post National" was an instruction-based performance about revolution and protest for 12 unrehearsed performers between the ages of 18 and 24.

In 2012, she wrote a modern English libretto for Volcano for Handel's Clori, Tirsi e Fileno renamed A Synonym for Love performed at the Gladstone Hotel with CMC. Her libretto was nominated for a Dora Mavor Moore Award that year for best new musical or opera.

In 2012, she curated the inaugural Live Art Series at the SummerWorks Performance Festival in Toronto featuring a 40-day performance installation by performance artist Nina Arsenault.

== Miscellany ==
In 2007 she ran an Advice Booth on Brick Lane giving £1 advice with Morgan McBride. She and McBride are now married. This booth was the subject of a documentary by Current TV and has appeared at Latitude Music Festival.

Her maternal grandfather is a famous Hungarian film actor.
