= Charles Field =

Charles Field may refer to:

- Charles Frederick Field (1805–1874), British detective
- Charles K. Field (1873–1948), American poet, journalist, and magazine editor
- Oakey Field (Charles William Frederick Field, 1879–1949), English footballer
- Charles W. Field (1828–1892), American military officer
- Charles W. Field (Maryland politician) (1857–1917), American politician and lawyer
- Charles Field (cricketer) (1863–1930), English cricketer and officer in the British Indian Army

== See also ==
- John Charles Fields (1863–1932), Canadian mathematician
- C. C. Field Film Company, established by Charles C. Field
