= Rikiwulf =

Viking warrior

Rikiwulf ("The rich and powerful wolf" or "The Ruler of the wolves") was probably a member of the legendary Scandinavian Wulfing dynasty. In the ninth century, he sailed with his Viking warriors down the river Lys in Flanders, and settled inter alia Rikiwulfinga-haim near Tielt, Rekkem near Menin, and Richebourg, Reclinghem, Racquinghem and Erquinghem-Lys in present Artois, France.

He was possibly related to the Norwegian Viking Hrolf of Heidmark, who was also a wulfing who had settled in Normandy. The wulfings were the ruling clan of the ancient Scandinavian Östergötland area. The Ynglinga Saga traces their origin back to Odin.

The epithet Rikiwulf was also used for Sigurd Eysteinsson of Orkney (846–92), who was nicknamed Riki Ylfing.

It is said that the famous Viking warrior Beowulf may likely have been from what was the Östergötland region (Sweden). Dr. Sam Newton, and Historians Boydell & Brewer proposed that the “Beowulf Saga” itself was composed in ancient Scandinavian Ostergland, inside the Wulfing Court.
