= Frederick R. McManus =

American Roman Catholic priest and academic

The Reverend Monsignor Frederick R. McManus
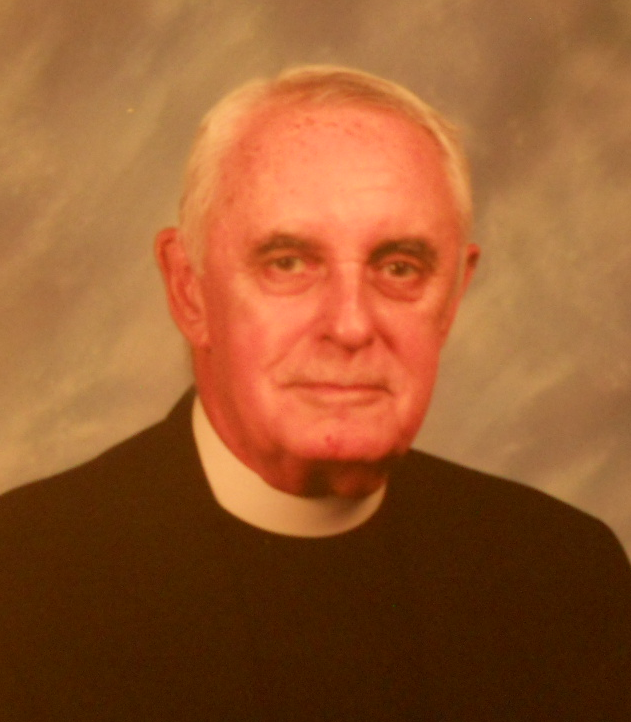

Vice President of Academics of The Catholic University of America
- In office 1983–1993

Personal details
- Born: February 8, 1923 Lynn, Massachusetts, U.S.
- Died: November 27, 2005 (aged 82) Boston, Massachusetts, U.S.
- Education: College of the Holy Cross; St. John's Seminary (BA); Catholic University of America (JCB, JCL, JCD)
- Occupation: Priest; canon lawyer; academic

Frederick Richard McManus (February 8, 1923 – November 27, 2005) was an American Catholic priest and academic who served as a peritus on the liturgy at the Second Vatican Council. He presided at the first English Mass in the United States in 1964 in St. Louis, Missouri.

McManus was also a leader in opening up Catholic dialogue with the Eastern Orthodox Church and served as dean of The Catholic University of America's School of Canon Law. He published eleven books on the liturgy as well as hundreds of popular articles, spending 40 years as editor of The Jurist: Studies in Church Law and Ministry.

== Biography ==
=== Early life ===
Born to Frederick and Mary (née Twomey) McManus, he had a younger brother Charles McManus. He attended Boston College High School followed by the College of the Holy Cross from 1940–42. He went on to St. John's Seminary in Brighton and received a Bachelor of Arts in 1947. He was ordained a priest on May 1, 1947.

=== Education and career ===
He received the following degrees: JCB (1952), JCL (1953) and JCD (1954), all from The Catholic University of America (CUA), where he served as Dean of the School of Canon Law 1967-1973, Vice Provost and Dean of Graduate Studies 1974-1983, and Academic Vice President, retiring in 1993 while continuing to teach until 1997 as Professor Emeritus.

=== Second Vatican Council ===
Monsignor McManus attended the Second Vatican Council as a peritus on the liturgy and member of the council's Liturgy Commission. He was the primary drafter of sections of the Constitution on the Sacred Liturgy. McManus served two terms as president of the Liturgical Conference. He was also made director of the Committee on the Liturgical Apostolate in 1965. As then president of the Liturgical Conference at its 25th gathering, with authorization from Cardinal Joseph E. Ritter, Father McManus presided over the first public Mass in English in the Kiel Auditorium in St. Louis, MO on August 24, 1964.

=== Associations and ecumenism ===
Msgr. McManus served as president of the Liturgical Conference from 1959–62 and 1964-65. He was key in establishing the Federation of Diocesan Commissions (FDLC) in 1968. He was a member of the International Commission on English in the Liturgy (ICEL) from its inception in 1963 throughout decades of translation. He helped promote dialogue between the Roman Catholic and Orthodox Churches. He consulted for the Secretariat for Promoting Christian Unity, was a member of the Catholic-Orthodox Bilateral Commission and served on the International Joint Commission for Catholic-Orthodox Theological Dialogue.

=== Death ===
McManus died in Boston, Massachusetts on November 27, 2005, at age 82.
