= Alexander Field (Blythe, California) =

Baseball venue in the United States

Coordinates: 33°37′1″N 114°35′58″W

Alexander Field is a baseball venue based in Blythe, California, United States. It is home to a professional baseball team, the Arizona Winter League's Blythe Heat.
