= Woodkirk Priory =

Priory in Morley, Leeds, England

Coordinates: 53°43′20.2″N 1°35′18.5″W

Woodkirk Priory was a cell of Augustinian Canons in West Yorkshire, England. William, second earl of Warenne (d. 1138), had granted the land for its foundation in 1135. It was a cell of Nostell Priory. Woodkirk became the site of a fair, granted by King Henry I and confirmed by King Stephen, which was particularly famous during the reign of King Edward II. The cell was dissolved in 1539, and the property later passed to the Savile family.

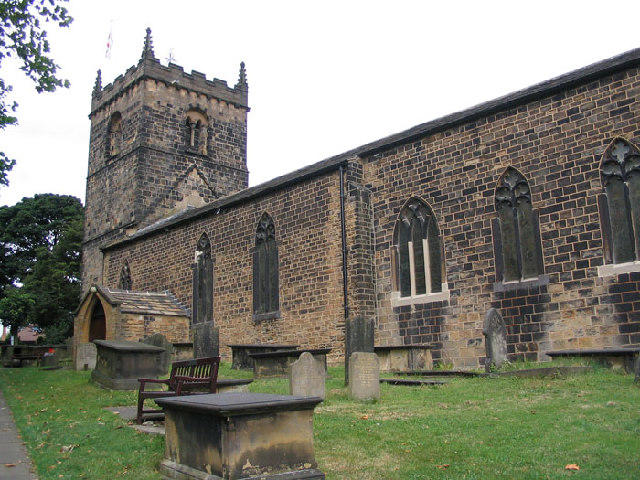
St Mary's church, now the parish church of Woodkirk

The priory was situated just east of the main road between Leeds and Dewsbury, now the A653 road, at the southern edge of Woodkirk. The church dedicated to St. Mary, a Grade II listed building, is still standing and was partly rebuilt after storm damage in 1832, while the other buildings have been demolished since the closure of the priory. Archaeological excavations of the grounds took place in 1962 and 1966.
