= Frederick Field (chemist) =

English chemist

Frederick Field FRS FRSE FCS (2 August 1826 – 3 April 1885) was an English chemist.

== Early life ==
He was born in Lambeth, London, the second son, by his second wife, of Charles Field, of the firm of J. C. & J. Field, candle manufacturers, etc. Educated at Denmark Hill grammar school and at Mr. Long's school at Stockwell (where he was a schoolfellow of Professor Odling), Field showed so strong a liking for chemistry that, on leaving school in 1843, he was placed in the laboratory of the Polytechnic Institution, then conducted by Dr. Ryan. On leaving the Polytechnic, Field entered into partnership with a chemist named Mitchell as an assayer and consulting chemist, but finding the need of further training spent some time as a student under Dr. Hoffmann in the Royal College of Chemistry in Oxford Street.

Field was one of the original members of the Chemical Society of London, started in 1846, and he read his first paper to that society in the following year.

== Work in Chile ==
In 1848, he accepted the post of chemist to some copper smelting works at Coquimbo in Chile. Some account of his work there is contained in his papers in the ‘Journal of the Chemical Society’ for 1850, 'On the Examination of some Slags from Copper-smelting Furnaces,’ and 'On the Ashes of the Cactus-plant,’ from which large quantities of carbonate of soda were obtained. In 1851 Field described a natural alloy of silver and copper, which had the appearance of nearly pure silver, and also discovered that a certain ore which occurred in large quantities near Coquimbo was in reality pure lapis lazuli, the first found in South America.

In 1852, Field was appointed manager of his company's works at Caldera, a new port to the north of Coquimbo. Before assuming this position he visited England and married a sister of (Sir) Frederick Abel, returning to Caldera in 1853, of which he was now appointed vice consul. The post involved many responsibilities in a land subject to revolutions. During the Crimean War, Field also acted as the representative of France in that district.

In 1856, Field became chemist and sub-manager to the smelting works then established by Señor Urmeneta at Guayacan, which have since become one of the largest copper-smelting works in the world. In 1859 a revolution broke out in Chile. Field sent his wife and family to England, but himself remained and succeeded in preserving the establishment from injury.

== Return to England ==
In September 1859 he finally quit Chile for England. Soon after his arrival in London he was appointed lecturer on chemistry to St. Mary's Hospital (1860), and in 1862 became professor of chemistry in the London Institution. In the same year he was appointed chemist to the aniline colour works of Simpson, Maule, & Nicholson, a post which he held till 1866, when he became a partner in the old firm of his family - Messrs. J. C. & J. Field - in which he remained and of which he was senior partner at the time of his death. He was elected a Fellow of the Royal Society in 1863.

== Death ==
In 1876 Field's health began to fail, and after a long illness he died on 3 April 1885.

== Writings ==
Field wrote forty-three papers on scientific subjects for various periodicals, in addition to one written in conjunction with his brother-in-law, Sir F. A. Abel. Among them are:

1. 'On the Solvent Power exercised by Hyposulphite of Soda on many Salts insoluble in Water' ('Journ. Chem. Soc.' 1863);
2. 'On the Solubility of the Halogen Salts of Silver in certain Solutions' ('Chemical News,’ 1861);
3. 'On the Existence of Silver in Sea-water' ('Proc. of the Royal Soc.' vol. viii. 1856–7);
4. 'Artificial Formation of Atacamite' ('Revue Universelle,’ 1859);
5. on 'Ludlamite, a new Mineral;’ and on 'The General Distribution of Bismuth in Copper Minerals' ('Journ. Chem. Soc.' 1862).
