= William Field =

William Field may refer to:

- William Field (minister) (1768–1851), English Unitarian minister
- William Field (Australian pastoralist) (1774–1837), English transportee turned Tasmanian businessman
- William Field (American politician) (1790–1878), Lieutenant Governor of Connecticut, 1855–1856
- William Field, 1st Baron Field (1813–1907), English judge
- William Field (cricketer) (1816–1890), Tasmanian cricketer
- William W. Field (1824–1907), American politician, 16th Speaker of the Wisconsin State Assembly
- William Field (Irish politician) (1848–1935), Nationalist (Parnellite) Member of Parliament
- Lt William George Field (died 1850) associate of Colonel Light in South Australia
- William Hughes Field (1861–1944), Member of Parliament in New Zealand
- William R. Field (1907–1988), Irish-born priest in Nigeria
- Bill Field (1909–2002), British Labour Party Member of Parliament for Paddington North, 1946–1953
- Billy Field (Gaelic footballer) (born 1952), Irish former Gaelic footballer
- Billy Field (singer) (born 1953), Australian singer/songwriter
- William Todd Field (born 1964), American actor and filmmaker

== See also ==
- R. William Field, academic at the University of Iowa
- William Fields (disambiguation)
