= Spontelectrics =

Production of electric fields by thin films of various materials

In solid state physics, spontelectrics is the study and phenomenon of thin films of various materials producing strong electric fields.

== Properties ==
When laid down as thin films tens to hundreds of molecular layers thick, a range of materials spontaneously generate large electric fields. The electric fields can be greater than 10^{8} V/m.

Spontelectric behaviour is intrinsic to the dipolar nature of the constituent molecules.

The detection (in ~2009) of spontaneous electric fields in numerous solid films prepared by vapour deposition raises fundamental questions about the nature of disordered materials.
