= Stan's Cafe =

British theatre company

- Stan's Cafe
- Address: @ A. E. Harris, 110 Northwood Street; Birmingham; United Kingdom
- Type: Experimental theatre

Construction
- Years active: 1991-present

Website
- www.stanscafe.co.uk

Stan's Cafe /ˌstænz ˈkæf/ is a theatre company based in Birmingham, United Kingdom, with a long track record in producing experimental theatre, installations and live art. Established in 1991, it has become "one of Britain's major contemporary theatre exports" with an "international reputation" for devising and touring powerful and "unusual performances." It has been regarded by some critics as "one of the UK's most innovative and exciting theatre companies."

== Venue and theatre production history ==
Stan's Cafe was founded by James Yarker and Graeme Rose in 1991 – both Theatre Studies graduates from Lancaster University. The company's unusual name was derived from a real café just off Brick Lane in London.

The partnership between Yarker and Rose was from the start supplemented by collaborations with associate artists from a variety of backgrounds. With productions of Memoirs of An Amnesiac and Canute The King – the latter premiered in Moseley Road Swimming Baths – Stan's Cafe established itself as a company of exciting potential. Having rehearsed these early productions in borrowed spaces and a spare room in a rented house in the Balsall Heath district of Birmingham, the company started rehearsing and presenting work at mac (formerly Midlands Arts Centre) once it received its first significant public funding for Bingo in the House of Babel, inspired by theories of artificial intelligence and virtual reality. The company moved its office to the venue in 1997. mac also supported the company by commissioning three shows, namely Voodoo City, a show about urban magic and controlling one's own destiny; Dance Steps, an installation about a love story of two people who meet at mac; and Tuning Out With Radio Z, a three-hour-long improvised show performed in front of a live audience and webcast as a radio show with the audience invited to contribute ideas and text via SMS messages or an online bulletin board. These productions contributed to the company being described as "one of the [UK's] most tirelessly inventive theatre companies...breaking the mould of what theatre can and might be."

In 1996, Stan's Cafe won a Barclays New Stages award for its two-woman production, Ocean of Storms, about notions of gravity and ohm. It was included on its tour dates in The Royal Court's studio space. In 1998, a funding crisis prompted by the controversial and highly minimalist production Simple Maths led to one of the company's most significant productions, It's Your Film. It could be seen by only one spectator at a time, who was installed in a photo booth, eye-level positioned facing the centre of the small screen. It was commissioned for The Bond, a small independent art gallery and whilst originally planned to be presented for one night only, it went on to become an extremely prolific show touring to 37 cities in 15 countries, including an international premiere at the Theatre Formen Festival in Hannover, Germany in June 2000. The success of It's Your Film led to the company developing a strand of paratheatrical works that will be discussed in the next section.

In 2000, Good and True, a comedy that "explores how questions produce more queries than answers", was commissioned by Birmingham City Council's Forward Festival. This production toured the United Kingdom and remained in the company's repertoire long enough to be shown at the Linbury Studio in the Royal Opera House in 2003.

In order to rehearse their ambitious 'rock musical' Lurid and Insane, inspired by an obituary for the Bokassa, the company moved out of mac into a factory unit on New Canal Street above a firm of die stampers. Before its demolition in 2006, this space hosted the devising of Be Proud of Me, a collaboration with photographer Ed Dimsdale built on the language of tourist phrase books – early versions of the company's training day, A City Adventure (which is discussed further in the Education section). Giving other companies access to their space as well as hosting parties and concerts by underground bands kindled the company's ambition to run its own venue.

Between 2006 and 2009, the company operated from an office in The Big Peg in Birmingham's jewellery quarter. Whilst here the company devised and toured Home of the Wriggler, a piece inspired by the Longbridge Car Plant and its closure. Described as a "lo-fi sci-fi docu-drama", this piece was notable for its actors having to power the show's lights and sound through on-stage dynamos.

In 2007, the company was commissioned by the Vienna Festival, Warwick Arts Centre, and The Fierce Festival to make a large scale sequel to their intimate production, It's Your Film. The Cleansing of Constance Brown uses a proscenium arch 2m wide to frame the end of a corridor 14m deep with seven doors on each side. This device frames the action powerfully and is inspired by work of Insomniac Theatre, for whom Stan's Cafe members, Amanda Hadingue and Craig Stephens had also worked. This production defied financial logic by touring extensively with a show with a cast of 7 and 2 tonnes of equipment whose audience, for reasons of sightlines, was limited to fifty per performance. It has since been seen in Bucharest, Toronto and Cologne, amongst other international destinations.

In 2009, Stan's Cafe moved into a vacant portion of the A E Harris and Co. metal working factory which provided sufficient space to host rehearsals, storage and the company's office. The freedom of having their own venue allowed the company to work outside the normal restrictions associated with having to hire or be booked by established venues. This freedom was used to make The Just Price of Flowers almost spontaneously, written in a little over a week and rehearsed in a similar period. The show used a Brechtian approach to theatre, complete with narrator/singer and placards, to discuss the 1998 financial crisis through the phenomena of Tulipmania in The Netherlands in 2010. This low budget 'austerity production' was promoted almost entirely through social media and was initially presented for just three nights at the company's home venues using set and costumes recycled from The Cleansing of Constance Brown. Success of this initial run led to the production being re-staged, with a largely new cast, as a co-production with Birmingham Repertory Theatre.

Stan's Cafe's increasing tendency to make work over an extended period and to place pauses between premiere performances and touring can be seen in The Cardinals which was rehearsed in three blocks across 2010 and 2011 before its premiere at Domaine d'O in Montpellier, France, the venue that co-commissioned the project. A year would elapse before its second run at its other commissioning venue, Warwick Arts Centre. After a further week at The Drum in Plymouth, another year would elapse before the production was re-performed at The Roundhouse in London and Stan's Cafe's own venue in Birmingham in January and February 2013. The Cardinals' religious concerns led to a booking at the Christian Greenbelt Festival in 2012. The flat, almost childlike set of the cardinal's puppet theatre, is reminiscent of the company's very first production Perry Como's Christmas Cracker, in which two incompetent theatrical impresarios attempt to squeeze the Christian nativity story into a pantomime form.

In 2013, the company opened its first serious adaptation, an attempt to stage the vast 17th century book The Anatomy of Melancholy by Robert Burton.

== Para-theatrical work ==
The success of It's Your Film described by one critic as "the Godfather of one-on-one theatre" led Stan's Cafe to be invited to make a range of other para-theatrical projects.

In 2000, Birmingham City Council commissioned The Black Maze for its Revolution Festival on 2 and 3 January. This sensory art installation was originally constructed to be installed in galleries, but its popular success led to its re-installation in the back of a 7.5-ton truck, allowing it to visit street festivals across the UK and into Europe. It is an intimate theatre experience that is different for each participant, creating a one-of-a-kind shared experience for those who enter in twos or threes.

In 2002, Jubilee Arts commissioned Space Station for the Birmingham – Wolverhampton Metro, which saw three astronauts appear on new platform labelled Earth North Central attempting to catch a train to the planets, a feat made apparently possible through an alteration to the maps onboard all metro trains. To make the piece possible, negotiations with the Department of Transport were needed in order to install the platform and stop the train at an authorized point to allow the astronauts to board at the end of the day. Train conductors had to become semi-official gallery guides as passengers encountered the performance (and the others that were spread out along the metro line between West Bromwich and Wednesbury).

In 2003, Radiator commissioned Broadway Hertz, a sound installation that, through placing microphones around the building allowed audience members to re-mix the building's sounds.

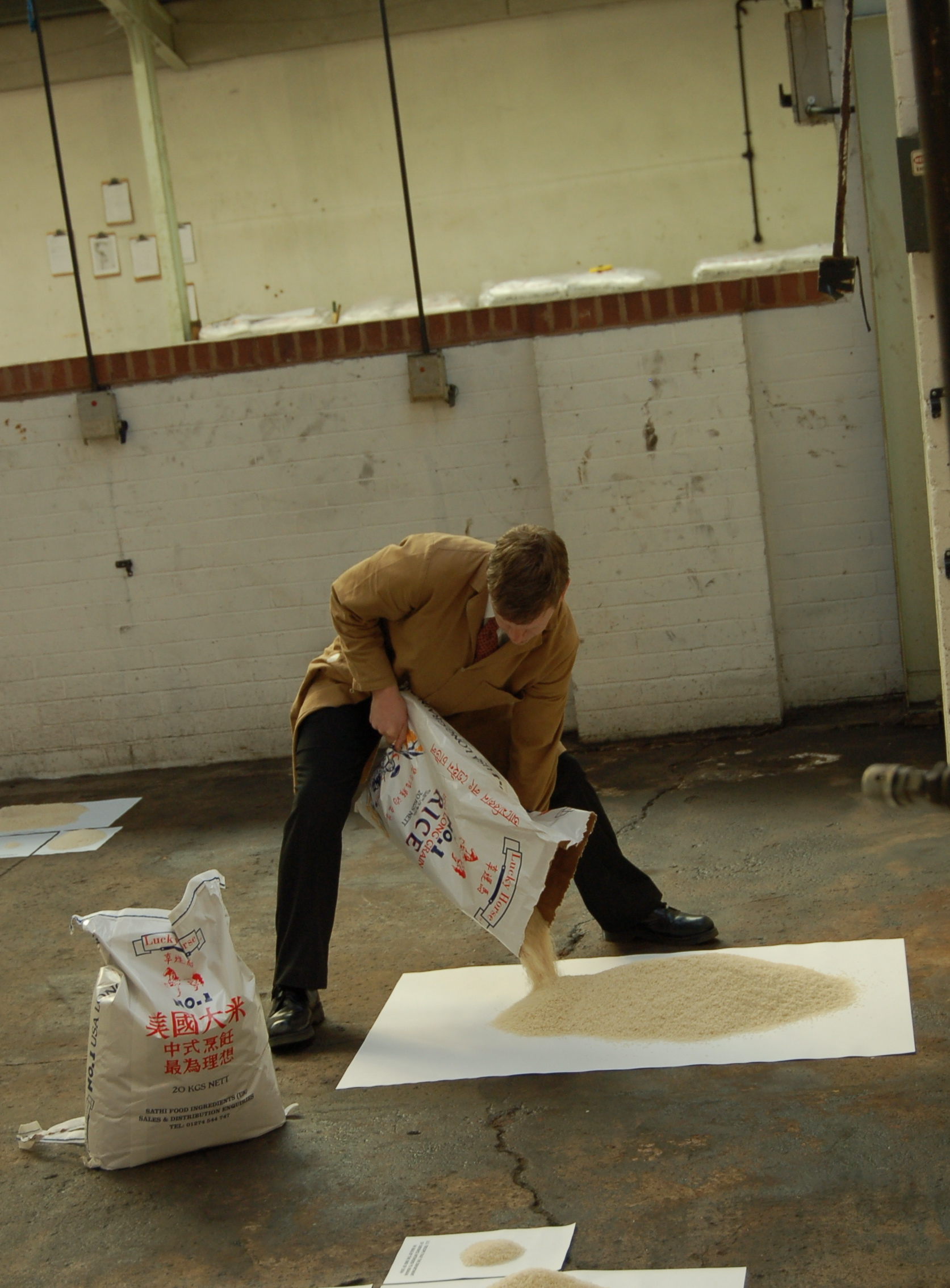
Of All the People in All the World: Two 20 kg bags of rice became the number of people displaced in Darfur.

Almost simultaneous with the opening of Broadway Hertz was the opening of Of All the People in All the World at Warwick Arts Centre. In 2002, the company received its first ever revenue funding from Arts Council England, freeing the company from the restriction of always agreeing projects and budgets for subsidy in advance. This freedom allowed the company to spend approximately £700 on a tonne of rice, enough for each person in the UK to be given a grain. The project's simple premise that "one grain = one person" allowed for human population statistics to be represented as carefully counted/weighed piles of rice sitting on labelled sheets of white paper. The ability of the show to directly and flexibly address human concerns in an engaging and emotionally powerful manner led to the show's rapid success. It remains in the company's repertoire regularly performing around the world, mostly in theatre festivals and in a range of scales from 1 tonne of rice up to vast versions of 104 and 112 tonnes representing the entire world's population at the time of performance. The 104 tonne version for Theatre De Welt, commissioned by Marie Zimmerman, is documented in a book with photographs by Ed Dimsdale and poetry by Alan Hay. It is perhaps the success of All the People in All the World that has turned Stan's Cafe into an international festival favourite.

The freedom of their own venue allowed Stan's Cafe to pursue apparently whimsical projects. In 2009, 24 Hour Scalextric saw audience and actors racing slot cars around a vast track for 24 hours to coincide with the Le Mans race of that year. The piece was transformed into art by two commentators giving a live webcast description of the entire reach. The company's policy of pressing interesting projects without a close scrutiny of long term viability was again vindicated as schools started to request their own miniature versions of the race in order to promote literacy and mathematics. Also spinning off from the race were the two commentator figures who were later commissioned by East Side Gallery, Fierce Festival and projects who variously requested the commentators webcast commentaries on a football match – whilst only being able to watch an audience watch a match on a big screen, view from a hotel window just overlooking Birmingham's busiest street of nightclubs, the Crab Fair in Egremont, including the World Gurning Championships in 2011.

In 2008, mac approached Stan's Cafe for a show to celebrate the arts centre's closure for redevelopment. The subsequent project, Dance Steps, inspired by teach yourself to dance floor mats gave audiences the opportunity to take roles in a mini drama by following vinyl foot, hand and 'object prints' spread around a venue. Between 2008 and 2012, The Steps Series has appeared in 18 venues being re-made for each new setting adapting its narrative according to the architecture and context of its setting.

== Education work ==
Since its earliest days, Stan's Cafe has worked in education settings. The first of its large scale devised shows was When in the Future They Look Back at Us, a piece of visual theatre devised with students at the Emmbrook School in Reading.

For a while, the company mostly ran workshops to support its touring shows. Then it moved to making videos and stop frame animations, following a commission to make Head to Head with Foxhollies Special School. No Walls Just Doors, a piece of visual theatre with a soundtrack by Brian Duffy, was devised with Stage 2, mac's youth theatre. This piece was followed by an adaptation of Claire Dowie's monologue into a poly-vocal piece for thirteen performers. Theatre shows were also devised with undergraduates at Demontfort University (three), Warwick Arts Centre and Coventry University.

The initiation of Arts Council England's Creative Partnerships program led to an increase in the company's education work and its move away from performative traditions.

In 2002, Stan's Cafe was tasked to develop a day-long experience that would explore the role of risk-taking in creative learning for teachers from the 26 schools working as part of this initiative. The company devised a Risk Day, where teachers working in pairs were given a series of choices that guided their navigation around and through Birmingham city centre, collecting observations and encounters, to an end point in Digbeth at the Chuck Works (Stan's Cafe base) and then the Custard Factory, where the Creative Partnerships is located.

In 2004, School Rulers with Castle Vale School created ten artworks in collaboration with students that addressed those student's concerns around school. The same year, Stan's Café devised Plague Nation, a spin-off from of All the People in All the World, initially with four schools in Birmingham, Bristol and Nottingham. In each case, a class of 30 or so school students from Year 9 (13–14 years old) collaborated with their teachers and performers from the company to create an installation out of 989 kg. of rice. This version of the project has been written about in a number of studies of Theatre-In-Education-Practice. In 2009, Space Steps saw The Steps Series transform Beaumpnt Leys School into a space ship. In 2011, Fruit and Veg Cities saw children from Forestdale Primary School create city scape diorama from fruits and exhibit them in the Birmingham's bullring markets.

== Audio work ==
Stan's Café's long-term collaboration with musician and studio engineer, Jon Ward, led to the CD titled Pieces for the Radio Volume 1, tracks from which were played on BBC Radio 3's Late Junction as well as at The Big Chill Festival.

It was followed by Pieces for the Radio Volume 2: Comfort Hour. The CD was an hour long improvised piece recorded by the cast of Lurid and Insane and produced by Brian Duffy with text by James Yarker. Sections from this were also played on Late Junction.

So Bring Me Down, an audio adaptation of Ocean of Storms, was produced by artist/musician Jony Easterby and Brian Duffy. It was commissioned by Andrew Chetty for NOW98, Nottingham's annual performance festival for their radio station, NOWFM, and released on their CD.

I See with My Eyes Closed was a collaboration with composer Michael Wolters commissioned by Birmingham Contemporary Music Group (BCMG) which makes the audience privy to the thoughts of two audience members at a classical music conference.

The company's second collaboration with Wolters resulted in The Voyage, a 12 long minute opera commissioned by PRS for Music for the Cultural Olympiad, staged at Stan's Cafe's venue. The show used a seating back on wheels to extend the stage from an intimate space to the start to a 30m long running track in the middle and back to the intimate space for the close. The piece was composed for ensemble of one singer, a double bass, and thirteen recorders – two of which play microtonally. This piece was recorded and broadcast by Radio 3 and later staged at the Hayward Gallery as part of the 20x12 Festival.

== Miscellaneous projects ==
Stan's Cafe's independence and diversity of interests has allowed it to pursue a wide range of projects, some of which are not easy to classify. Some critics note that Stan's Cafe's projects exemplify "the subtle hybridity of recent British postmodern performance." Although the company sees itself as a theatre company and promote itself as such, it has used "interdisciplinary sources to produce performances."

In 1999, the company undertook a pioneering project of re-staging The Carrier Frequency, Impact Theatre's highly regarded collaboration with novelist Russell Hoban, better known for his dystopian novels such as Ridley Walker, for Birmingham City Council's Towards the Millennium Festival. Using video documentation as the primary 'text', Graeme Miller remastered the original soundtrack he had recorded with Steve Shill, and Russell Hoban supplied his original texts. The re-staging ran for three nights at The Crescent Theatre in Birmingham and was the subject of a conference on 'Archeology, Repertory and Theatre Inheritance' and supplement in Live Art Magazine. This remembering was in part developed with the intervention of the academy.

In 2000, Stan's Cafe curated The Future Art Symposia for Birmingham City Council's Forward Festival. It was funded by the National Lottery via the Arts Council England, bringing together a range of artists, curators, and academics from a variety of backgrounds. This series of four symposia discussing the present and future of art themed around 'Art and The New'; 'Art and Society'; 'Art and Technology'; and 'Art and Time.' The speakers were Jonathan Watkins, Heather Maitland, John Wyver, Ansuman Biswas, James Yarker, Michael Van Graan, Claire Smith, Alun Mountford, Sadie Plant, Heidi Reitmaier, Ann Whitehurst, Brian Duffy, Mike Pearson, Christopher Egret, and Claire Russ. Transcripts of the presentations were later published in book form.

A City Adventure is a creative orienteering adventure commissioned by Creative Partnerships as a training course for teachers encouraging creative thinking and teaching for creativity. The adventure was successful enough to be repeated more than a dozen times and franchised to theatre companies, Desperate Men in Bristol and Third Angel in Sheffield.

Framed was commissioned for the 2002 Croydon International Film Festival. It combined public street performances making a video framed around the venue using members of the public as extras. The video was edited whilst shooting was still underway by Joseph Potts in tandem with Giles Perrin creating a soundtrack. The completed film then formed the basis of a live performance which took the audience from watching a film, to watching real life synching with film and being ushered outside to watch the shooting of the film's final scene. Lighting designer and pyrotechnical Paul Arvidson mocked up a fire in the building.

In the winter of 2004, Stan's Cafe created Ho Ho Ho, an on-line guide to illuminate Christmas displays around Birmingham and the Black Country, in collaboration with The Public. Edited by novelist Catherine O'Flynn, this project included photographs of displays, interviews with their creators, reviews, editorial comment, suggested tours and safety advice.

== Touring ==
Touring has always been at the heart of Stan's Cafe's mission. During its early years, the company initially toured to arts centres across the UK. From 2000 onwards, international touring became increasingly key to the company's success. In more recent years, as opportunities to tour in the UK have drastically reduced, the company has looked to present shows for a week at a time in the studio spaces of larger theatres.

== The company ==
From its inception, Stan's Cafe was a partnership open to outside collaborators. In 1995, Graeme Rose left to form The Resurrectionists with composer Richard Chew. In 1997, James Yarker was joined by part-time administrator, Paulette Terry Brien, who left to form The International 3 gallery in Manchester. Craig Stephens, who joined the company as an associate artist in 1997 to devise and perform in Simple Maths, went on to become a full-time employee of the company, devising and performing in all the company's shows as well as leading on numerous education projects. He is the company's Associate Director. Nick Sweeting, founder member of Improbable, joined as part-time advisory producer in 2003, while Charlotte Martin joined as General Manager in 2005. Graeme Rose returned to the company as a performer of It's Your Film in 1999 and performed in numerous productions thereafter as well working for a spell as part-time Education Officer for the company – job sharing with artist, Ana Rutter. Karen Stafford was taken on as Production Manager to cope with high demand for Of All the People in All the World. She left to take up a job as production manager at the Greenbelt Festival.

Stan's Cafe has a history of long-term collaborators. Amanda Hadingue devised and performed with the company in most major productions between 1993 and 2010. Sarah Dawson devised and performed in most major productions between 1994 and 2000 before concentrating full-time working for her own company, Corali.

Heather Burton appeared in The Carrier Frequency revival. She also devised and performed in Lurid and Insane, Framed and Home of the Wriggler as well as touring with Be Proud of Me, It's Your Film and extensively with Of All the People in All the World.

Bernadette Russell devised and performed in Framed, Home of the Wriggler and The Cleansing of Constance Brown as well as being recast into The Just Price of Flowers and guest starring in Tuning Out With Radio Z.

Playwright, novelist and founding member of Talking Birds Theatre Company Nick Walker devised and performed in Simple Maths and Good and True as well as touring with It's Your Film and making a special guest appearance in I See with My Eyes Closed.

Jake Oldershaw first worked with Stan's Cafe having successfully auditioned for Simple Maths, and subsequently appeared in The Carrier Frequency and The Cleansing of Constance Brown before touring extensively with It's Your Film, The Black Maze and The Cleansing of Constance Brown.

Andy Watson, who had previously performed in Large Scale International under the name Andy Walker, was persuaded out of retirement to take the lead in Lurid and Insane. He subsequently performed in It's Your Film on tour and both drove and invigilated The Black Maze on tour. He devised The Cleansing of Constance Brown but was taken ill shortly before the premiere performance. His role in this show has subsequently been taken by Gareth Brierly (of The People Show and White Rabbit), Ray Newe (who had previously devised Bingo in the House of Babel and Voodoo City with the company) and Nick Tigg (of SlotMachine). Most recently, this role has been taken by Jake Oldershaw whose original role has in turn been taken by Jack Trow.

Gerard Bell first appeared for the company devising The Cleansing of Constance Brown. He picked up the role of Van Driver in the recasting of The Just Price of Flowers, appeared in The Voyage, and devised and performed in The Cardinals and The Anatomy of Melancholy.

Chris Dugrenier, Charlotte Gregory, Kerrie Reading and Lucy Nicholls have all performed of All the People in All the World on numerous occasions, undertaken education work with the company, and appeared in the original production of The Just Price of Flowers. Gregory was retained for subsequent production of this show and appeared as a replacement performer in The Cleansing of Constance Brown.

Jack Trow first collaborated with Stan's Cafe whilst still at school in Adult Child / Dead Child, as a member of Stage 2. In 2008, he started touring with of All the People in All the World and went on to pick up roles in The Cleansing of Constance Brown and Just Price of Flowers. He has performed in It's Your Film and regularly conducts education work for the company.

Rochi Rampal also collaborated with Stan's Cafe whilst still at school in No Wall, Just Doors. She devised and performed in The Cardinals, The Voyage and The Anatomy of Melancholy.

Simon Ford has collaborated with the company as graphic designer since 1993. With his company F22 Design, he has also taken on the design of the company's website and CD-ROMs. His most active collaboration with the company has come with The Steps Series where his graphic design is integral to the piece and he collaborates on devising the story alongside Stephens and Yarker. A further key member of the Steps Series team is the visual artist Denise Stanton.

Paul Arvidson was the company's long term lighting designer working on almost every major project requiring lighting between 1994 and 2010. For Tuning Out With Radio Z, he improvised the lighting plot alongside the improvised action.

Richard Chew composed and recorded music for all Stan's Cafe's productions between 1991 and 1995 as well as Still, a side-project with James Yarker commissioned by English National Opera's Baylis program New Visions/New Voices. Still was a 20-minute opera about John Franklin's attempts to discover the North West Passage. Richard's most involved collaboration with the company came when he devised and performed in Memoirs of an Amnesiac, a piece about the life of an Eric Satie obsessive. Rick also sang live in the swimming pool version of Canute the King. More recently he contributed a short element for The Cardinals that the actors sing live on stage.

Besides working on Pieces for the Radio Volume 1, Jon Ward worked with Richard Chew on the soundtrack for Voodoo City. He composed the soundtrack for Simple Maths and various versions of a self-evolving soundtrack for of All the People in All the World. He also recorded indents and programmed the message board software for Tuning Out With Radio Z.

Nina West started composing for Stan's Cafe when a track of hers was heard at a party by James Yarker. She was tracked down and, together with Rebecca Jane Webster, recorded the soundtrack for Ocean of Storms. She devised and performed in Lurid and Insane, performed on Comfort Hour, and created the soundtrack for Be Proud of Me and The Cleansing of Constance Brown for which she toured as the only ever-present member of the performing or technical crew, mixing the soundtrack live for every performance. She has provided soundscapes for Spy Steps, Giant Steps, Apollo Steps, Final Steps and Market Steps. Most recently, she has provided the soundtrack for The Anatomy of Melancholy.

Long-time collaborator Ed Dimsdale photographs for every project between 1998 and 2008. He was most closely involved with Be Proud of Me, in which the company formed an integral part of the devising time providing more than a hundred images that help drive the narrative forward when projected behind the action as part of both scenery and the main character's perspective and psychological point of view.

Since 2009, the company's production photographs have all been taken by specialist theatre photographer, Graeme Braidwood.

== @ A. E. Harris ==
In September 2008, Stan's Cafe hired 13,000 square feet of factory space from A E Harris and Co. (Birmingham) Ltd. on Northwood Street in Birmingham's Jewellery Quarter in order to stage of All the People in All the World. The arrangement worked so well that the two parties came to a long-term agreement. From January 2009, Stan's Cafe started using the venue, named @ A. E. Harris as its rehearsal space, performance venue, and office.

Through hosting performances and rehearsals from many local companies as well as the inaugural BE Festival (Birmingham European), the venue came to gain an international reputation as an artist-run space.

Mixtures of paid and bartered arrangements with British Dance Edition, Birmingham Opera and the Birmingham Repertory Theatre alongside sponsorship support in kind from A E Harris and Co. led to the building's progressive upgrading. The innovate collaboration of Stan's Café with A E Harris and Co. won an Arts and Business Award in 2009.

== See also ==
- Culture of Birmingham
- Experimental theatre
- Of All the People in All the World
- Mac (Birmingham)
- Birmingham City Council
- Warwick Arts Centre
