= Feilde =

Feilde is an English surname. Notable people with the surname include:

- Edmund Feilde (1620–1676), British barrister and politician
- Paul Feilde (1711–1783), British lawyer and politician

== See also ==
- Feild
- Adele M. Fielde (1839–1916)
