= Charles Field (cricketer) =

English cricketer and soldier

Personal information
- Full name: Charles William Field
- Born: 30 January 1863; Patna, Bengal Presidency, British India
- Died: 24 May 1930 (aged 67); Fleet, Hampshire, England
- Batting: Unknown
- Bowling: Unknown

Domestic team information
- Years: Team
- 1902/03–1907/08: Europeans

Career statistics
Competition	First-class
Matches	3
Runs scored	32
Batting average	6.40
100s/50s	–/–
Top score	21*
Balls bowled	90
Wickets	2
Bowling average	25.00
5 wickets in innings	–
10 wickets in match	–
Best bowling	2/33
Catches/stumpings	3/–
- Source: Cricinfo, 23 December 2023

Charles William Field JP (30 January 1863 – 24 May 1930) was an English first-class cricketer and an officer in the British Indian Army.

Field was born in British India at Patna in January 1863. He attended the Royal Military College at Sandhurst, graduating from there into the Royal Norfolk Regiment as a second lieutenant in August 1883. Shortly thereafter, he transferred to the South Wales Borderers in October 1883. He transferred to the British Indian Army in August 1887, with Field being attached to the Bengal Staff Corps and given the rank of lieutenant. He was based in India at Multan Cantonment, where he was a cantonment magistrate; in June 1893, he was appointed a justice of the peace by Sir Dennis Fitzpatrick. In India, Field made three appearances in first-class cricket for the Europeans cricket team, all against the Parsees; two of these came in the 1902–03 Bombay Presidency Matches, with the other coming in the 1907–08 Bombay Presidency Match. In these, he scored a total of 61 runs and took two wickets.

Following prior promotions to captain and major, he was promoted to lieutenant colonel in August 1909. After spending ten years in civil employment, he was transferred to the supernumerary list of the British Indian Army in February 1915. Following the end of the First World War, retired from active service in October 1921. Field retired to England, where he died in May 1930 at Fleet, Hampshire.
