= Paul Field =

Paul Field may refer to:

- Paul Field (bobsledder) (born 1967), bobsledder from Great Britain
- Paul Field (musician) (born 1961), Australian singer-songwriter and musician
- Paul Field (rugby league), Australian rugby league footballer who played in the 1980s
- Paul Field (Christian singer), musician from Great Britain
