= Thomas Field =

Thomas Field may refer to:

- Thomas Field (Anglican priest, born 1829) (1829–1899), "Canon Field", Anglican priest in South Australia
- Thomas Field (Anglican priest, born 1855) (1855–1936), Church of England priest
- Thomas Field (Catholic priest) (1546–1625), Irish Jesuit priest and explorer
- Thomas Field (politician) (1859–1937), New Zealand politician of the Reform Party
- Tom Field (born 1997), Anglo-Irish footballer
- Tommy Field (born 1987), American baseball shortstop

== See also ==
- Tom Fields (born 1992), Australian rules footballer
- Tom Fields (artist) (born 1951), Muscogee Creek/Cherokee photographer from Oklahoma
- Thomas C. Fields (1825–1885), New York politician
