= James Field =

James Field may refer to:

- James Field (criminal) (1714–1751), boxer and criminal from Ireland
- James G. Field (1826–1901), American politician from Virginia
- James C. Field (fl. 1890s), American photographer
- James A. Field (1880–1927), American economist
- James Field (baseball) (born 1890, date of death unknown), American baseball player
- James A. Field Jr. (c. 1916–1996), American historian
- Jamie Field (born 1976), rugby league footballer

== See also ==
- James Fields (disambiguation)
