= Joshua Field =

Joshua Field may refer to:

- Joshua Field (engineer) (1786–1863), British mechanical engineer
- Joshua Field (artist) (born 1973), American artist

== See also ==
- Josh Fields (disambiguation)
