= Richard Field =

Richard Field may refer to:

- Richard Field (Jesuit) (1554?–1606), Anglo-Irish Jesuit
- Richard Field (printer) (1561–1624), English printer and publisher, best known for his close association with the poems of William Shakespeare
- Richard Field (theologian) (1561–1616), English ecclesiological theologian associated with the work of Richard Hooker
- Richard Stockton Field (1803–1870), United States Senator from New Jersey, and later a United States federal judge
- Richard Field (politician) (1866–1961), member of the Tasmanian Parliament
- Richard Field (judge) (born 1947), judge of the High Court of England and Wales
- Richard Field (footballer) (1891–1965), British footballer
- Richard D. Field (physicist) (born 1943), United States physics professor

== See also ==
- Rich Field, defunct military field in Texas
- Richard Fields (disambiguation)
