= Stephen L. Field =

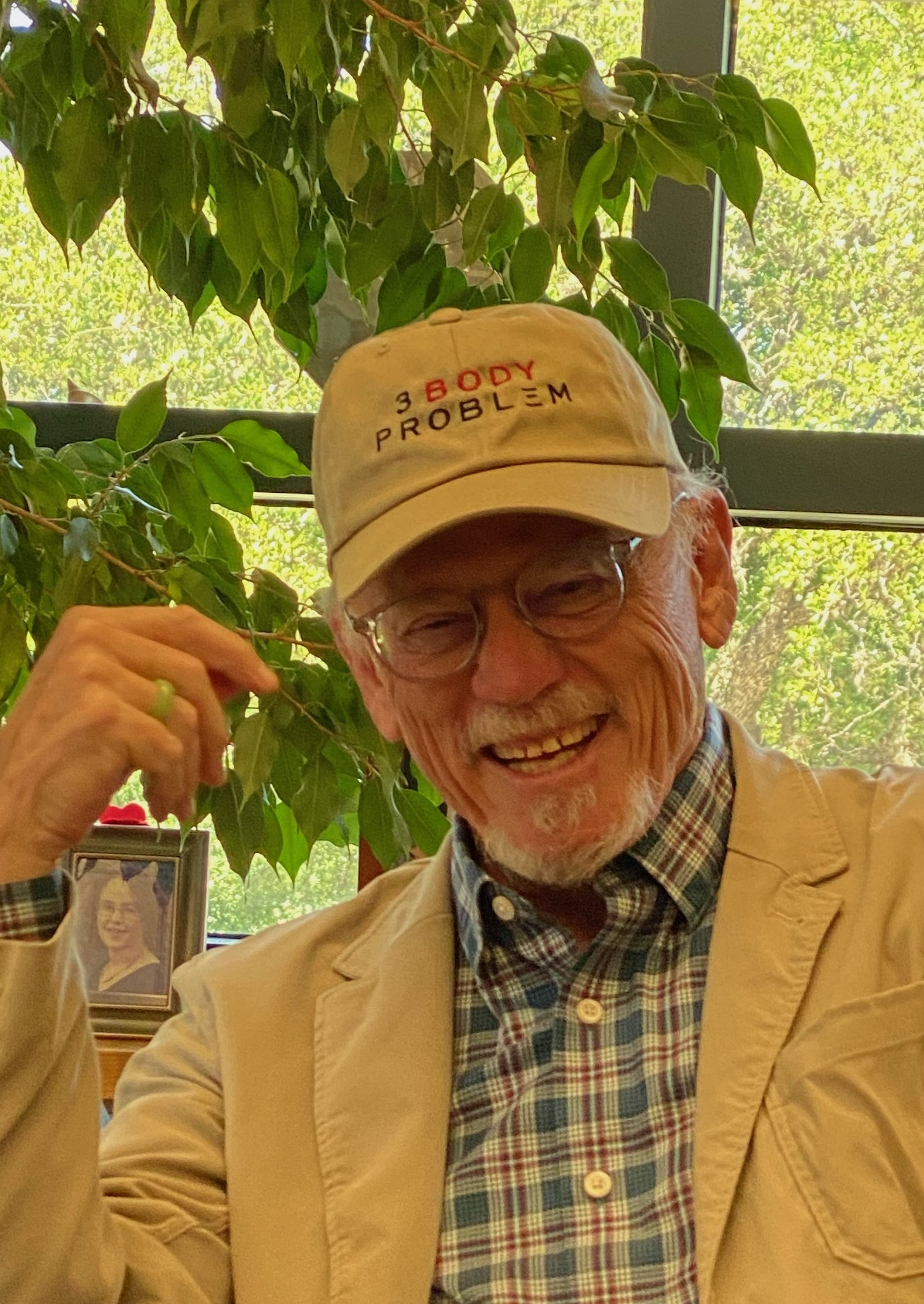
- Occupations: Literary scholar, academic, and author

Academic background
- Education: B.A., English Literature; PhD, Comparative Literature
- Alma mater: University of Texas at Austin (UT Austin)

Academic work
- Institutions: Trinity University

Stephen L. Field is an American literary scholar, academic, and author. He is the J.K. and Ingrid Lee Endowed Professor of Chinese Language & Literature in the Department of Modern Languages and Literatures at Trinity University.

Field is most known for his works in pre-Qin Chinese literature and early Chinese cosmology, particularly in relation to the ancient art of fengshui. His website, FengshuiGate.com, features essays he has written on various aspects of fengshui, along with his translation of the earliest fengshui classic, the Zangshu, or Book of Burial.

== Early life and education ==
Raised on a West Texas farm, Field developed an interest in nature and discovered nature poetry while majoring in English romanticism. He earned a Bachelor of Arts in English Literature in 1974 and a PhD in Comparative Literature in 1985, both from the University of Texas at Austin (UT Austin). Inspired by the philosopher Lao Tzu, he studied Chinese and wrote his dissertation on ancient China's tianyuan 田園 "field and garden" poets, akin to Western pastoral poetry.

== Career ==
Field began his academic career as an assistant professor in the Department of Modern Languages and Literatures at The College of William & Mary from 1985 to 1990 where he founded their Chinese major. In 1990, he joined Trinity University to establish their Chinese program, serving as assistant professor from 1990 to 1993 and as associate professor from 1993 to 2000. Since 2008 he has served as the J.K. and Ingrid Lee Endowed Professor of Chinese Language and Literature at Trinity.

Field was chair of the Department of Modern Languages and Literatures from 2001 to 2009. Since 2006 he has been co-director of the East Asian Studies at Trinity (EAST) Program, and received the 30-year Service Award in 2020. In 2023, SWCAS named their new undergraduate conference paper award after him.

== Scholarship ==
In 1991 Field analyzed the literary image of the farmer in Chinese literature in his first scholarly publication, "Ruralism in Chinese Poetry: Some Versions of Chinese Pastoral," in which he argued that traditional literary criticism overlooked this category and aimed to highlight Chinese rural themes through modern and comparative interpretation.

Field studied ancient Chinese poetry under Roy Teele at UT Austin and translated Tianwen 天問, "The Questions of Heaven" from the Chuci, a poem cataloging Chinese myth, legend, and history, which was published in several venues, including his book Tianwen: A Chinese Book of Origins. In this translation, he rendered the 186 questions into couplets, added a historical introduction and notes to help English-speaking readers' understanding of the underlying Chinese tales.

During graduate school in the 1980s, while working on his father's farm in the summers, Field began formulating a poem on Chinese Cosmogony, which expanded over the years to 40 pages in length and was published as "In a Calabash: A Chinese Myth of Origins" in 1997, with an excerpt titled "The Calabash Scrolls" later featured in the 2001 book Daoism and Ecology. While translating the poem "Tian Wen," he discovered a theory regarding the use of the Warring States period shipan 式盤 by the poet, which led to his article on the instrument, in which he emphasized its role as a microcosmic key to understanding the poem's cosmic themes, suggesting that references to such devices likely enhance comprehension of its imagery throughout the text. Furthermore, he translated shipan as cosmograph, now the accepted term for that proto-scientific instrument, which was known only from obscure classical references until archaeological discoveries in the 1970s.

Field's research on Chinese geomancy began with the cosmograph, the ancestor of the fengshui compass, and in 1998, he launched "Professor Field's Fengshui Gate", featuring his work, including the first English translation of the Zangshu 葬書 or Book of Burial. Among other related works, he published an article elucidating contemporary fengshui. He also authored a chapter titled "A Geomantic Reading of Asian Diasporic Literature," where he applied geomancy to explore themes of displacement, identity, and cultural orientation in the works of Amy Tan and others.

After graduating from college in 1974, and encountering for the first time a 19th-century English translation of the I Ching, Field resolved to be able to read the work in Chinese someday, and four decades later published The Duke of Zhou Changes. This work sought to restore the early Zhou dynasty context using pre-Confucian sources, while providing insights into the myths and legends surrounding the Zhouyi's creation and guidance for casting the oracle and interpreting readings. Prior to this, he authored Ancient Chinese Divination, which Diana Marston-Wood reviewed, noting that it "provides an excellent introduction to Chinese divination and does so without unnecessary complexity." She also remarked, "This volume provides an excellent pathway toward a clearer understanding of the critical elements of Daoism and a framework for comprehending the ways that Confucianism, Daoism, and eventually Buddhism, interacted within an evolving Chinese culture."

== Bibliography ==
=== Books ===
- Tian Wen: a Chinese Book of Origins (1986) ISBN 9780811210102
- Ancient Chinese Divination (2008) ISBN 9780824832452
- The Duke of Zhou Changes: A Study and Annotated Translation of the ZhouYi (2015) ISBN 9783447104067

=== Selected articles ===
- Field, S. (1991). Ruralism in Chinese Poetry: Some Versions of Chinese Pastoral. Comparative Literature Studies, 1–35.
- Field, S. (1992). Cosmos, Cosmograph, and the Inquiring Poet: New Answers to the "Heaven Questions". Early China, 17, 83–110.
- Field, S. L. (2000). Who Told the Fortunes? The Speaker in Early Chinese Divination Records. Asia Major, 1–14.
