= Roger Field =

Roger Field may refer to:

- Roger C. Field (born 1945), British inventor
- Roger Field (plant scientist) (born 1946), British-born New Zealand plant scientist and university administrator
