= E. J. Field =

British neuroscientist (1915–2002)

Ephraim Joshua Field (20 March 1915 – 1 August 2002) was a British neuroscientist.

== Education ==
Field studied medicine at the University of Durham, UK. Previously lecturer and then reader in anatomy at the University of Bristol, he moved to Newcastle as invited by Henry Miller to become a consultant neuropathologist at Newcastle University. The university awarded him a personal chair in experimental pathology. His subsequent pioneering work on multiple sclerosis, scrapie and kuru, during which he discovered the beginnings of the mechanics of prion diseases, attracted attention from the Medical Research Council who appointed him honorary director of a new demyelinating diseases research unit. Field's work on the kuru was the subject of a 1970 BBC Horizon documentary in New Guinea.

Field was a prolific researcher and author, having published almost 300 academic papers, including 14 in Nature, 54 in The Lancet and 40 in the BMJ. He was also a fellow of the Royal College of Physicians. His children with his wife Dereen are David, a distinguished physicist, and Judith, an expert in art and mathematics.
