= Jack Fields (disambiguation) =

Jack Fields may refer to:

- Jack Fields (born 1952), Texas businessman and former Republican member of the United States House of Representatives
- Jackie Fields (1908–1987), American boxer
- Patch panel, aka Jack fields, devices used to route electrical signals

== See also ==
- John Fields (disambiguation)
