= Ringstad =

Ringstad may refer to the following locations:

- Ringstad, Nordland, a village in Bø Municipality in Nordland county, Norway
- Ringstad, Innlandet, a village in Gran Municipality in Innlandet county, Norway
