= Seyntex =

- Founded: 1908
- Headquarters: Oostrozebeke, Belgium
- Key people: Arthur Seynaeve
- Website: www.seyntex.com

Seyntex is a Belgian textile manufacturing company. The company's headquarters are in Tielt, Belgium.

== History ==
The company was founded in Oostrozebeke, Belgium, in 1908 by Arthur Seynaeve as a flax-weaving mill. The company expanded into weaving, knitting, dyeing, finishing, coating, textile printing, and manufacturing. The company is led by the fourth generation, with production facilities across the world. The company's main focus is on high-tech textiles, as well as bulletproof and CBRN defense products.

== John Field ==
John Field is a Seyntex trademark. It originally specialized in horseback riding and shooting (hunting) apparel. It moved to shooting and rain apparel. Each type of garment is given special properties, such as magnets for closing pockets, high visibility, and mosquito-repellent properties.

== Sources ==
- Seyntex
- Belgian king visits Seyntex (Dutch)
- Fire destroys Seyntex factory (Dutch)
