= Andy Field (academic) =

English academic

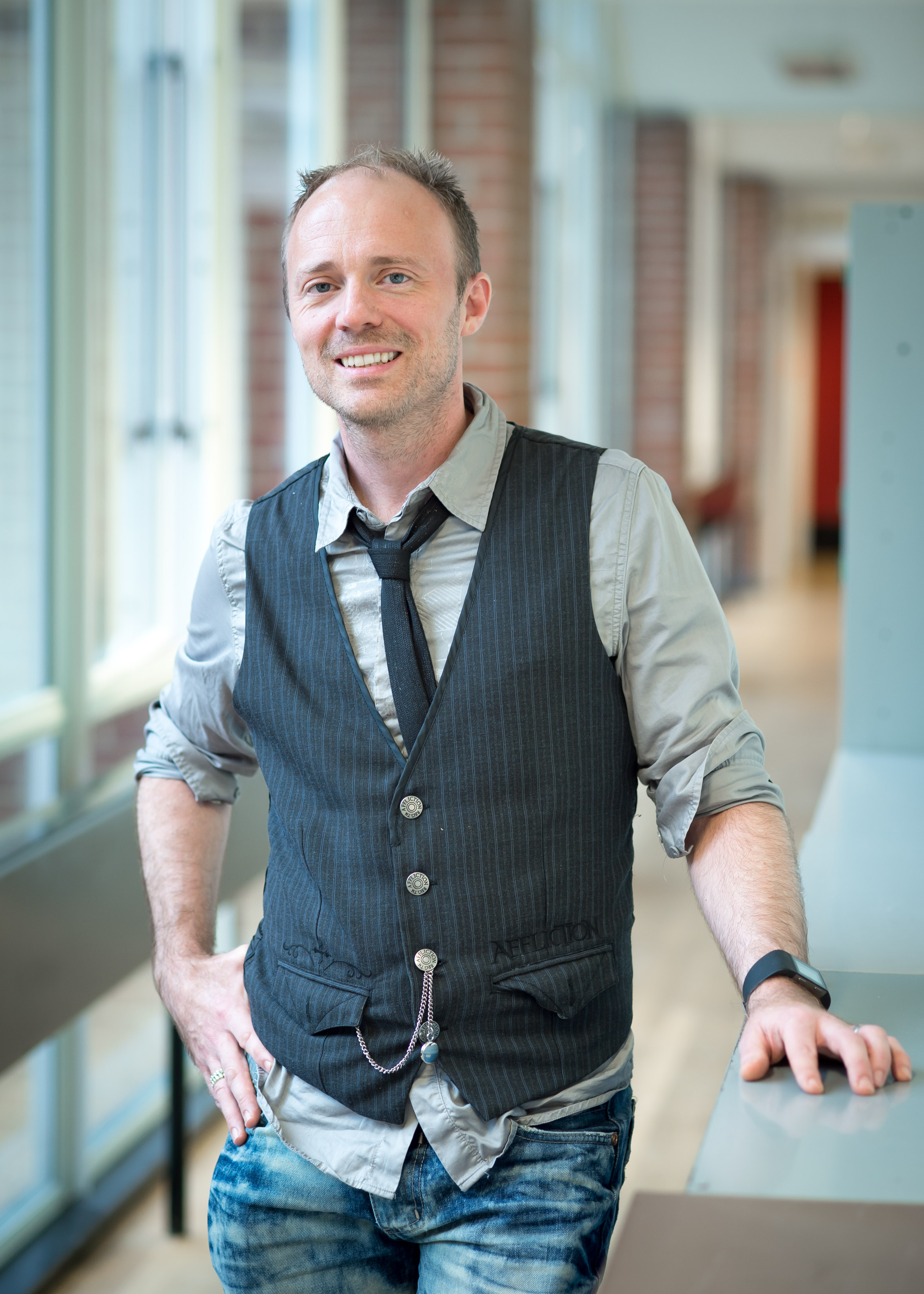
Professor Field 2015.

Andy Field (born 21 June 1973) is an English academic currently serving as Professor of Quantitative Methods at the University of Sussex.

Field is noted as the author of several textbooks about statistics, which typically deal with software application of statistical theory in SPSS and the R programming language. His books are characterised by an irreverent, sometimes outrageous, writing style that is atypical of academic texts. His student-friendly approach to writing led to The Times Higher Education Supplement dubbing him 'the Harry Potter of the social sciences'.

== Personal life ==
In his books, Field typically cites the music that he listened to while writing. The bands cited are predominantly in the genres of Rock music, Progressive rock, and Heavy metal music. He lists his musical heroes as Dave Murray of Iron Maiden and Mikael Åkerfeldt and Martin Axenrot of Opeth. From 1989 until 1996 Field played guitar and sang in the heavy metal band Scansion and in a 2014 article he discusses playing the drums in a band called Fracture Pattern. His books make frequent references to his pets.

He is married with two sons, and lives in Brighton.

== Professional life ==
Field obtained a Bachelor of Science (BSc) in Psychology in 1994 from City University London and a Doctorate of Philosophy (DPhil) from University of Sussex in 1997. Field has supervised at least one Masters Student's dissertation. Field has received different honours from the British Psychological Society: their Teaching Award in 2005 which recognises unusually significant contributions to education and training in psychology within the UK. And in 2007 the Book Award for the second edition of his book Discovering Statistics Using IBM SPSS Statistics: and Sex and Drugs and Rock 'N' Roll. In 2010 he received a National Teaching Fellowship for individual excellence in teaching.

He became Fellow of the Higher Education Academy (FHEA) in 2009 and Fellow of the Academy of Social Sciences in 2010. His current field of research lies in anxiety, child development and mathematics attainment.

In 2016 Field published An Adventure In Statistics: The Reality Enigma, which is described as a textbook embedded within a novel. The book also contains graphic novel elements. The book was a finalist for The Association of Learned & Professional Society Publishers Award for Innovation in Publishing, the British Book Design and Production Awards (Primary, Secondary and Tertiary Education category) and the British Psychological Society book award.

== Books ==
- Discovering Statistics Using IBM SPSS Statistics: and Sex and Drugs and Rock 'N' Roll. (5th edition) Sage Publications, 2017.
- An Adventure in Statistics: The Reality Enigma. Sage Publications, 2016.
- Discovering Statistics Using R: and Sex and Drugs and Rock 'N' Roll. Sage Publications, 2012.
- How to Design and Report Experiments. (1st edition) Sage Publications, 2003.
- Clinical Psychology. Learning Matters, 2003.
