= Andy Field (artist) =

Andy Field (born 1983) is an artist, writer, curator and academic based in London.

== Biography ==
He has created and toured his own contemporary performance work in the UK and internationally. He is most well-known for the work he creates in collaboration with young people. His performance Lookout has toured to cities including Beijing, London, Vancouver, Cairo and Milan and in 2018 won the Spirit of the Fringe award at Auckland Fringe Festival in New Zealand. He regularly collaborates with producer Beckie Darlington and in 2021, their project The Book of St Helens, a guide-book to the town of St Helens created by 150 local primary school children, won the Liverpool City Region Culture and Creativity Impact Award for Improving Education.

Andy is co-director of Forest Fringe, a multi award winning artist-led producing collective which originated in Bristo Hall at the Forest Café during the Edinburgh Festival in 2007 and has since curated events, entitled "Microfestivals", in venues across the UK and Europe. Andy Field innovated The Travelling Sounds Library through Forest Fringe, a case of books containing audio-pieces by British Theatre artists, including Blast Theory and Stan's Cafe which has travelled to venues throughout the UK. On their website Forest Fringe writes, "we try and serve as a bridge, finding imaginative ways to connect the country’s most innovative performance artists and theatremakers with new audiences, new supporters and new contexts for their work. " Forest Fringe also created a book of DIY performances to be read at the Edinburgh Festival called "Paper Stages", featuring performance texts by Tim Etchells, Bryony Kimmings and Tania El Khoury. Readers could obtain a book by volunteering one hour at a local Edinburgh charity during the Edinburgh Fringe Festival. In 2009 and in 2016 he and Forest Fringe co-director Deborah Pearson were named in the Stage list of the 100 most influential people in British theatre.

In 2022, Andy and Deborah Pearson co-directed the feature film Dream Agency, which premiered at the Edinburgh International Film Festival.

Between 2007 and 2011 he regularly wrote about art and experimental theatre for the Guardian Stage website. In 2020 he collaborated with the journalist Maddy Costa to write Performance in the Age of Precarity, a collection of essays on theatre and art for Bloomsbury. Field completed a practice-led PhD at Exeter University in 2012 exploring the relationship between contemporary performance practice and experimental art happenings in the 1960s and 1970s in New York.

== Forest Fringe Awards ==
- Herald Angel, 2008
- Peter Brook Award Special Mention, 2008
- A special Fringe First shared with The Arches for Innovating new forms of presenting work at the Edinburgh Festival, 2009
- Jack Tinker Spirit of the Fringe Shortlist, 2009
- Peter Brook Empty Space Award, 2009
- Herald Angel, 2011
- Total Theatre Award for Significant Contribution, 2016
