= John Field (astronomer) =

English astronomer (c. 1520–1587)

John Field or Feild (1520/1530–1587), was a "proto-Copernican" English astronomer. Field was the son of Richard Field (d. 1542). He was born, it is supposed, at Ardsley in the West Riding of Yorkshire between 1520 and 1530. He received a liberal education, and Joseph Hunter, his descendant, conjectured that part of it was gained under the patronage of Alured Comyn, Prior of Nostell, from which house the cell of Woodkirk, near Ardsley, depended. Anthony à Wood believed that he studied at Oxford.

He was living in London at the date of his first Ephemeris (1556), and appears, from a remark in a manuscript in Lambeth Palace Library, to have been a public instructor in science.

== Publications ==
He published:

- Ephemeris anni 1557 currentis juxta Copernici et Reinholdi canones … per J. Feild … ad Meridianum Londinensem … supputata. Adjecta est Epistola J. Dee, qua vulgares istos Ephemeridum fictores reprehendit, London, 1556
- Ephemerides trium annorum, an. 1558, 59 et 60 … ex Erasmi Reinoldi tabulis accuratissimè ad Meridianum Civitatis Londinensis supputatæ, London, 1558

To the latter work the following are added:

- Canon Ascensionum Obliquarum cujusvis stellæ non excedentis 8 gradus Latitudinis confectus, and
- Tabula Stellarum Fixarum insigniorum, &c.

These works were the first in England in which the principles of the Copernican philosophy were recognised and asserted.

== Arms and crest ==
Coat of arms confirmed in 1558

On 4 September 1558 Field received a confirmation of arms and the grant of a crest allusive to his attainments in astronomical science, viz. the device of a red arm issuing from the clouds and presenting a golden orrery.

== Personal life ==
In about 1560 he married Jane (d. 1609), daughter of John Amyas, a Kentish gentleman, and some time between that date and 1577, settled down at Ardsley, where he continued till his death, his position being that of a gentleman held in esteem among the better class of his neighbours. In the Yorkshire visitation of 1585 he recorded his arms and crest and the names of his wife and nine children. In his will, dated 28 Dec. 1586, he describes himself as a "fermer sometyme student in the mathymathicke sciences". He died soon after the date of this will, the administration of his estate being granted to his widow on 3 May 1587. He is buried in the porch of the church of East Ardsley, Yorkshire and a memorial plaque which reads: "Beneath this porch lies buried John Field 1520-1587 He was the first astronomer in this country to make known the discoveries of Copernicus." His library passed into the hands of William Coley of York, who afterwards returned it to the family.
