= Of All the People in All the World =

Art installation

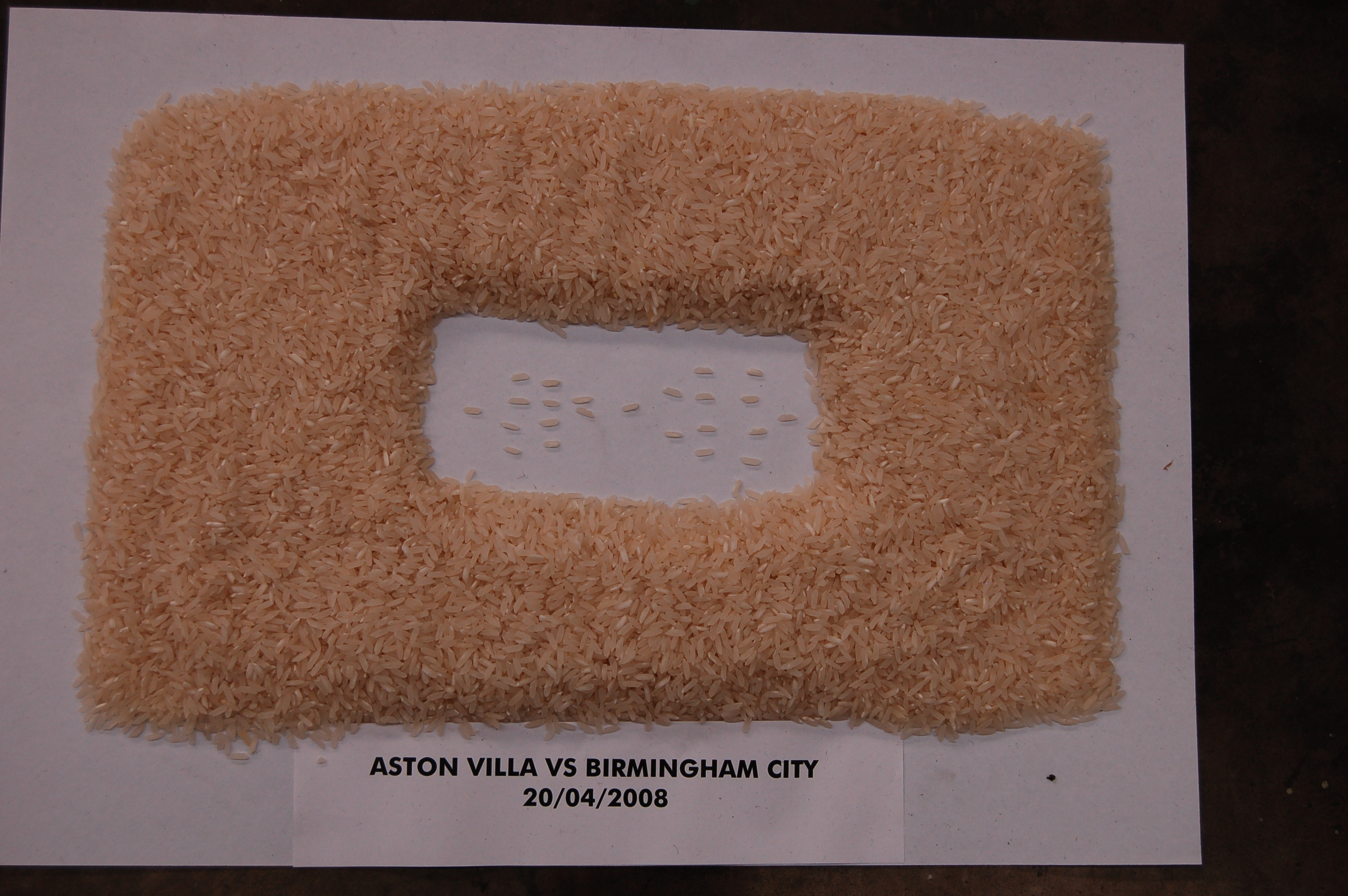
A pile of rice with one grain for every person at the Aston Villa vs. Birmingham City football match on 20 April 2008, with teams on the pitch

Of All the People in All the World, also known as the Rice Show, is an art installation and performance by Stan's Cafe, which utilises 112 tonnes of dry rice to represent the world's population, with one grain for each person (about 60 grains of rice—or people—per gram).

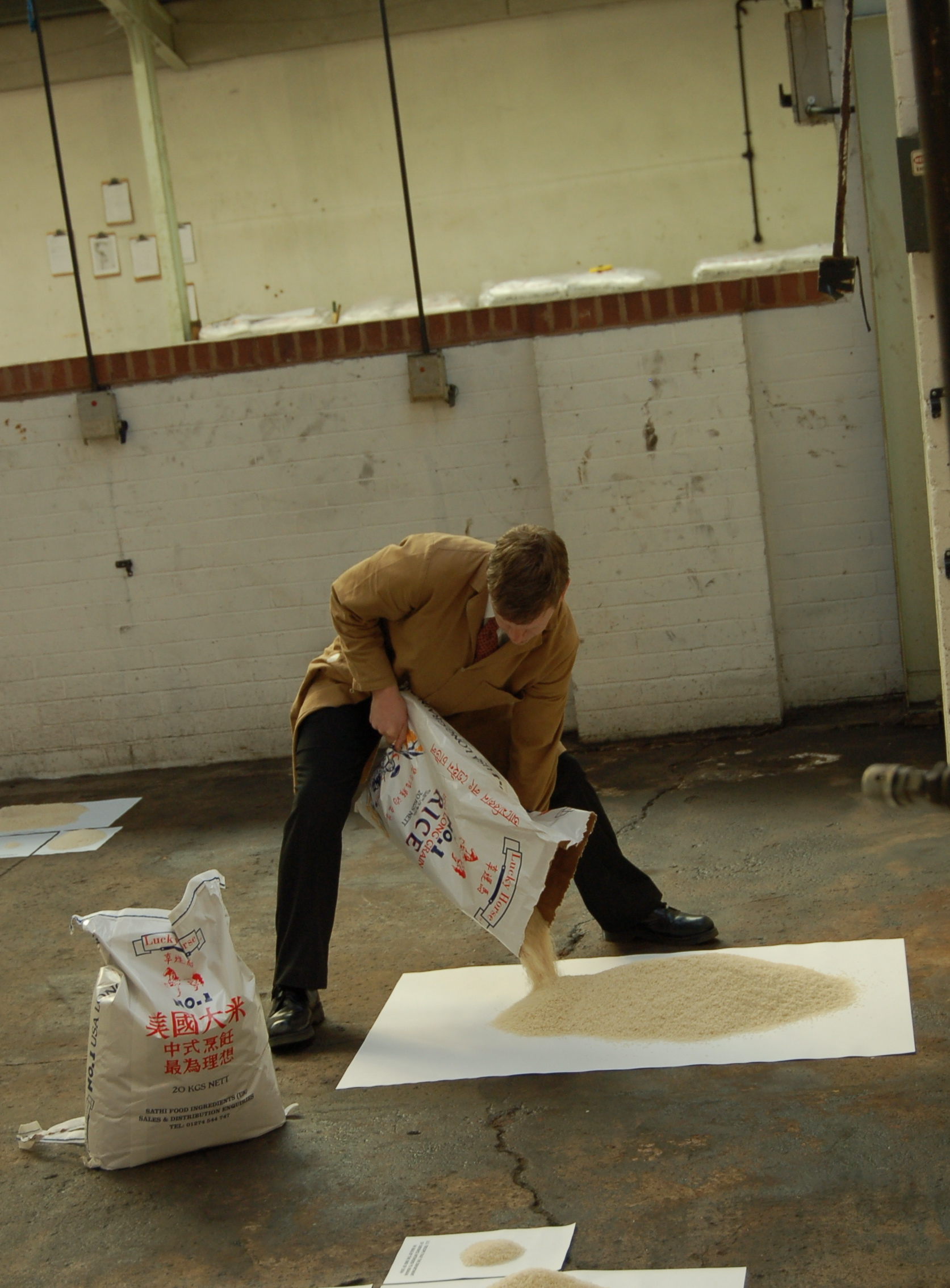
Two 20kg bags of rice became the number of people displaced in Darfur.

Individual piles of rice represent various statistics, such as "deaths in The Holocaust" or "the population of England". As the show progresses, new piles are made by "curators". Topical events are also covered, such as a pile representing the people who lost jobs upon the bankruptcy of Lehman Brothers, which happened during the September 2008 exhibition. Some of the piles are shaped to represent something associated with the statistic, such as the rice representing the crowd at a football match being in the shape of a stadium, with players in formation. Visitors, or people using the show's website, are invited to suggest new statistics for inclusion.

On arrival, visitors are each presented with a single grain of rice, to represent themselves.

Due to space limitations, some versions of the exhibition have had a more limited geographical scope, covering only the host country.

The installation was shown, in its full "All the World" configuration for only the second time, in a disused factory belonging to AE Harris in Birmingham, England: the home town of Stan's Cafe. At the end of the show, all the rice used was returned to the food chain.
