= Michel Field =

French journalist

- Born: Michel Feldschuh; 17 July 1954 (age 72); Saint-Saturnin-lès-Apt, Vaucluse, France
- Education: Lycée Claude Bernard; Lycée Balzac; Lycée Condorcet; Paris West University Nanterre La Défense
- Occupations: Journalist, philosopher, novelist
- Parent: Erwin Feldschuh

Michel Field (born 17 July 1954) is a French journalist, television presenter, philosopher and novelist. He is the author of several novels. He served as the political director of France Télévisions.

== Early life ==
Michel Field was born as Michel Feldschuh on 17 July 1954 in Saint-Saturnin-lès-Apt, Vaucluse, France. His father, Erwin Feldschuh, was an Austrian Jew who emigrated to France.

Field was educated at the Lycée Claude Bernard, the Lycée Balzac, and the Lycée Condorcet. He joined the Revolutionary Communist League at the age of 14, and he was expelled from his school because of his activism. He graduated from Paris West University Nanterre La Défense. He earned the CAPES and the agrégation in philosophy.

== Career ==
Field started his career as a philosophy teacher in Douai from 1979 to 1982, and in Versailles from 1982 to 1993.

Field is a journalist and television presenter. He became a co-presenter of Panomara, a radio programme on France Culture. He was a contributor to Les Nouvelles littéraires from 1984 to 1985. In 1992, he became a co-presenter on Ciel mon mardi!. He subsequently presented Le Cercle de minuit and Ça balance à Paris, followed by Au Field de la nuit on TF1 and Ring on LCI. He has been a co-presenter of Médiapolis alongside Olivier Duhamel on Europe 1 since 2007. He later served as the head of France 5. In December 2015, he was appointed as the political director of France Télévisions. He resigned in 2017.

Field is the author of several novels and non-fiction books.

== Works ==
- Field, Michel (1973). L'école dans la rue. Paris: Grasset. OCLC 951023.
- Brohm, Jean-Marie; Field, Michel (1975). Jeunesse et revolution : pour une organisation revolutionnaire de la jeunesse. Paris: François Maspero. ISBN 9782707107886. OCLC 300360601.
- Field, Michel (1984). Le passeur de Lesbos : roman. Paris: Barrault. ISBN 9782736000103. OCLC 11924541.
- Field, Michel (1986). Impasse de la nuit : roman. Paris: Barrault. ISBN 9782736000486. OCLC 14921845.
- Field, Michel (1987). Excentriques. Paris: Barrault. ISBN 9782736000684. OCLC 21373359.
- Field, Michel (1989). L'homme aux pâtes : roman. Paris: Barrault. ISBN 9782736000936. OCLC 21442668.
- Field, Michel (1995). Contes cruels pour Anaëlle : récit. Paris: Robert Laffont. ISBN 9782221079324. OCLC 34054389.
- Field, Michel; Scala, André (1997). Petits dialogues entre amis. Paris: Albin Michel. ISBN 9782226094131. OCLC 38544691.
- Cléau, Julie; Field, Michel (2002). Le Livre des rencontres. Paris: Robert Laffont. ISBN 9782221096253. OCLC 319884105.
- Field, Michel (2006). Le grand débat : roman. Paris: Robert Laffont. ISBN 9782221105658. OCLC 71810351.
- Duhamel, Olivier; Field, Michel (2008). Le Starkozysme. Paris: Presses de la fondation des sciences politiques. ISBN 9782020968027. OCLC 213490025.
- Field, Michel (2014). Le soldeur : roman. Paris: Julliard. ISBN 9782260017691. OCLC 873465723.
- Field, Michel (2016). Le vieux Blanc d'Abidjan dans sa prison de Yopougon : roman. Paris: Julliard. ISBN 9782260024019. OCLC 946102505.
