= OCEANUS =

Proposed space mission to Uranus

OCEANUS (Origins and Composition of the Exoplanet Analog Uranus System)
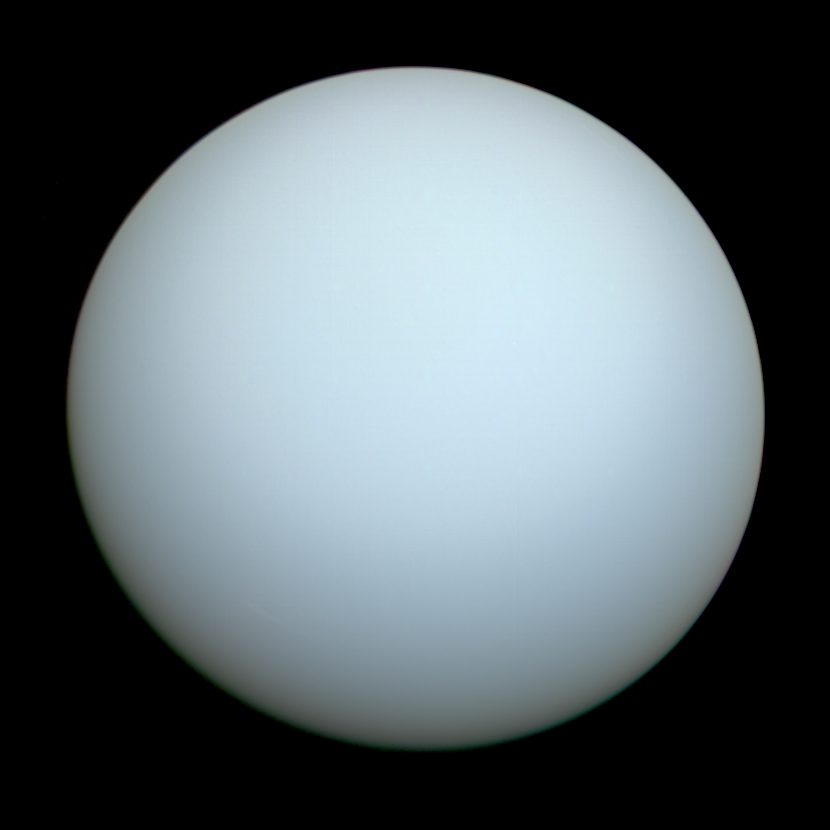
- Uranus, an ice giant planet, was photographed in real color by Voyager 2 in January 1986
- Mission type: Reconnaissance
- Operator: NASA/JPL
- Mission duration: ≥1.5 years

Spacecraft properties
- Launch mass: ≈3,939 kg
- BOL mass: ≈2,000 kg
- Dry mass: ≈1,110 kg
- Power: 290 W

Start of mission
- Launch date: 2030 (suggested)
- Rocket: Atlas V 511 or SLS

Uranus orbiter
- Orbital insertion: 2041
- Orbits: ≥14 (proposed)

OCEANUS (Origins and Composition of the Exoplanet Analog Uranus System) is a mission concept conceived in 2016 and presented in 2017 as a potential future contestant as a New Frontiers program mission to the planet Uranus. The concept was developed in a different form by the astronautical engineering students of Purdue University during the 2017 NASA/JPL Planetary Science Summer School. OCEANUS is an orbiter, which would enable a detailed study of the structure of the planet's magnetosphere and interior structure that would not be possible with a flyby mission.

Because of the required technology development and planetary orbital dynamics, the concept suggests a launch in August 2030 on an Atlas V 511 rocket and entering Uranus's orbit in 2041.

== Overview ==
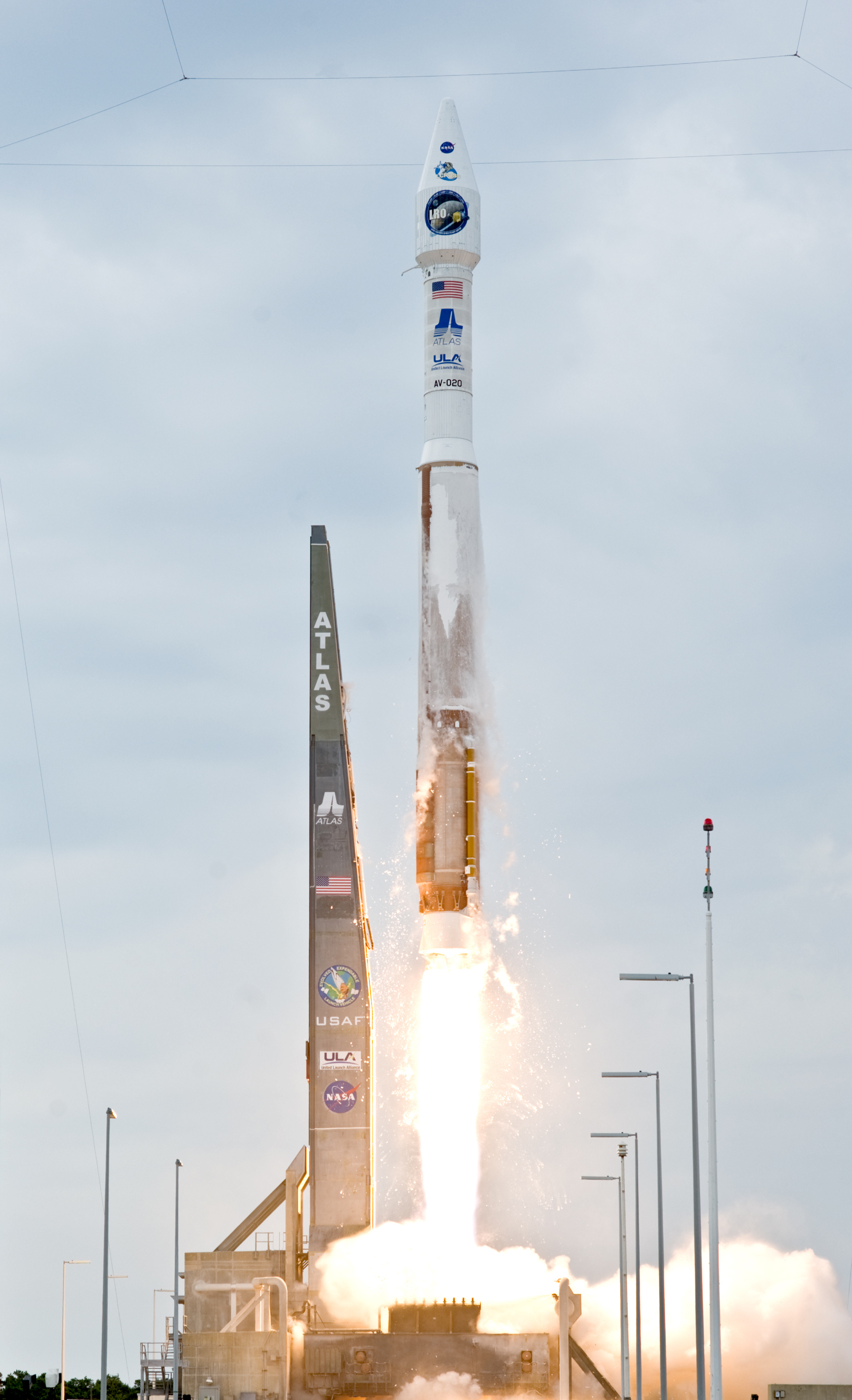
Atlas V, proposed for OCEANUS, shown here launching the Lunar Reconnaissance Orbiter into space

Ice giant sized planets are the most common type of planet according to Kepler data. The little data available on Uranus, an ice giant planet, come from ground-based observations and the single flyby of the Voyager 2 spacecraft, so its exact composition and structure are essentially unknown, as are its internal heat flux, and the causes of its unique magnetic fields and extreme axial tilt or obliquity, making it a compelling target for exploration according to the Planetary Science Decadal Survey. The primary science objectives of OCEANUS are to study Uranus's interior structure, magnetosphere, and the Uranian atmosphere.

The required mission budget is estimated at $1.2 billion. The mission concept has not been formally proposed to NASA's New Frontiers program for assessment and funding. The mission is named after Oceanus, the Greek god of the ocean; he was son of the Greek god Uranus.

== Power and propulsion ==
Since Uranus is extremely distant from the Sun (20 AU), and relying on solar power is not possible past Jupiter, the orbiter is proposed to be powered by three multi-mission radioisotope thermoelectric generators (MMRTG), a type of radioisotope thermoelectric generator. As of 2015, there was enough plutonium available to NASA to fuel three more MMRTG like the one used by the Curiosity rover, one of which was already committed to the Perseverance rover. The other two have not been assigned to any specific mission or program, and could be available by late 2021. A second possible option for powering the spacecraft other than a plutonium powered RTG would be a small nuclear reactor powered by uranium, such as the Kilopower system in development as of 2019.

The trajectory to Uranus would require a Jupiter gravity assist, but such alignments are calculated to be rare in the 2020s and 2030s, so the launch windows will be scant and narrow. To overcome this problem two Venus gravity assists (in November 2032 and August 2034) and one Earth gravity assist (October 2034) are planned along with the use of solar-electric propulsion within 1.5 AU. The science phase would take place from a highly elliptical orbit and perform a minimum of 14 orbits. If launching in 2030, reaching Uranus would occur 11 years later, in 2041, and it would use two bipropellant engines for orbital insertion.

Alternatively, the SLS rocket could be used for a shorter cruise time, but it would result in a faster approach velocity, making orbit insertion more challenging, especially since the density of Uranus's atmosphere is unknown to plan for safe aerobraking.

== Payload ==
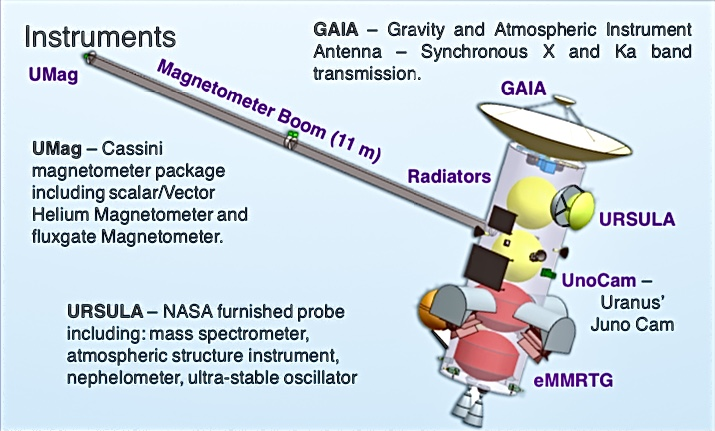
Schematic of the OCEANUS probe

The 12.5 kg scientific payload would include instruments for a detailed study of the magnetic fields and to determine Uranus's global gravity field:

- UMAG (Uranus Magnetometer) – is a magnetometer to study the magnetosphere and constrain models for dynamo generation.
- GAIA (Gravity and Atmospheric Instrument Antenna) – it would utilize the on-board communications antenna, transmitting in both X band and Ka band frequencies for radio science that would allow mapping Uranus's global gravity field.
- UnoCam (Uranus's Juno Cam) – is a visible light, color camera to detect navigation hazards in Uranus's ring system and to provide context and panoramic images.
- URSULA (Understanding Real Structure of the Uranian Laboratory of Atmosphere) – an atmospheric probe that would be jettisoned into the atmosphere of Uranus just before orbit insertion. It would descend under a parachute and measure the noble gas abundances, isotopic ratios, temperature, pressure, vertical wind profiles, cloud composition and density, via a mass spectrometer, atmospheric structure instrument, nephelometer and ultra-stable oscillator. The total mass of the probe's instruments is about 127 kg.

== See also ==
- Exploration of Uranus
- Magnetosphere of Uranus

Uranus mission proposals

- MUSE
- ODINUS
- Uranus Orbiter and Probe
- Uranus Pathfinder
