= Ice giant (disambiguation) =

An ice giant is a type of giant planet composed largely of 'ices', volatile materials heavier than hydrogen and helium.

Ice giant, Ice Giant, ice giants or Ice Giants may also refer to:

- Hrímþursar (sometimes controversially translated as "frost giants"), beings in Norse mythology
- Godlike beings in Terry Pratchett's Discworld series; see Sourcery

== See also ==
- Frost Giant (disambiguation)
