= Frost Giant (disambiguation) =

Frost giant is a common, but controversial, gloss for a type of jötunn, a being in Germanic folklore and mythology.

Frost Giant may also refer to:

== Fiction ==
- Frost Giants in Marvel Comics; see Giants (Marvel Comics)
  - Frost Giants (Marvel Cinematic Universe)
- Frost giants in Dungeons & Dragons; see Giant (Dungeons & Dragons)
- "The Frost-Giant's Daughter", a Robert E. Howard story featuring Conan the Barbarian

== Music ==
- Frost Giant (album), a 2005 album by The Dead Science

== Video games ==
- Frost Giant Studios, a video game developer formed in 2020

== See also ==
- Ice giant (disambiguation)
- Giants of the Frost, a 2004 horror/fantasy novel by Kim Wilkins
