= Exploration of Saturn =

Artist's concept of Cassini's orbit insertion around Saturn

The exploration of Saturn has been performed solely by crewless probes. Three missions were flybys, which formed an extended foundation of knowledge about the system. The Cassini–Huygens spacecraft, launched in 1997, was in orbit from 2004 to 2017.

== Flybys ==
=== Pioneer 11 flyby ===
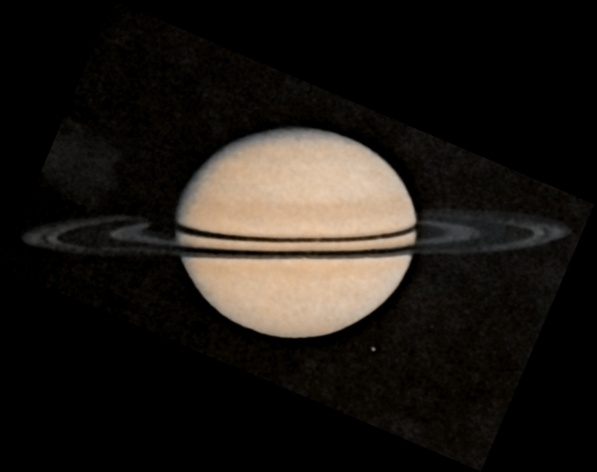
Pioneer 11 image of Saturn.

Saturn was first visited by Pioneer 11 in September 1979. It flew within 20,000 kilometres (12,000 mi) of the top of the planet's cloud layer. Low-resolution images were acquired of the planet and a few of its moons; the resolution of the images was not good enough to discern surface features. The spacecraft also studied the rings; among the discoveries were the thin F-ring and the fact that dark gaps in the rings are bright when viewed towards the Sun, or in other words, they are not empty of material. Pioneer 11 also measured the temperature of Titan at 250 K.

Pioneer 11 was also intended as a test of the ability for spacecraft to navigate through Saturn's Rings, which was first achieved on September 1, 1979. As the spacecraft moved through the F ring, Pioneer 11 nearly collided with the small moon Epimetheus, missing only by 4,000 kilometres (2,500 mi).

Pioneer 11 completed its survey of Saturn by October 1979, being the last planet visited by the probe and ceasing transmissions on September 30, 1995.

=== Voyagers ===
In November 1980, the Voyager 1 probe visited the Saturn system. It sent back the first high-resolution images of the planet, rings, and satellites. Surface features of various moons were seen for the first time. Because of the earlier discovery of a thick atmosphere on Titan, the Voyager controllers at the Jet Propulsion Laboratory elected for Voyager 1 to make a close approach of Titan. This greatly increased knowledge of the atmosphere of the moon, but also proved that Titan's atmosphere is impenetrable in visible wavelengths, so no surface details were seen. The flyby also changed the spacecraft's trajectory out from the plane of the Solar System which prevented Voyager 1 from completing the Planetary Grand Tour of Uranus, Neptune and Pluto.

Almost a year later, in August 1981, Voyager 2 continued the study of the Saturn system. More close-up images of Saturn's moons were acquired, as well as evidence of changes in the rings. Voyager 2 probed Saturn's upper atmosphere with its radar, to measure temperature and density profiles. Voyager 2 found that at the highest levels (7 kilopascals pressure) Saturn's temperature was 70 K (−203 °C) (i.e. 70 degrees above absolute zero), while at the deepest levels measured (120 kilopascals) the temperature increased to 143 K (−130 °C). The north pole was found to be 10 K cooler, although this may be seasonal. Unfortunately, during the flyby, the probe's turnable camera platform stuck for a couple of days and some planned imaging was lost. Saturn's gravity was used to direct the spacecraft's trajectory towards Uranus.

The probes discovered and confirmed several new satellites orbiting near or within the planet's rings. They also discovered the small Maxwell and Keeler gaps in the rings.

== Cassini orbiter ==
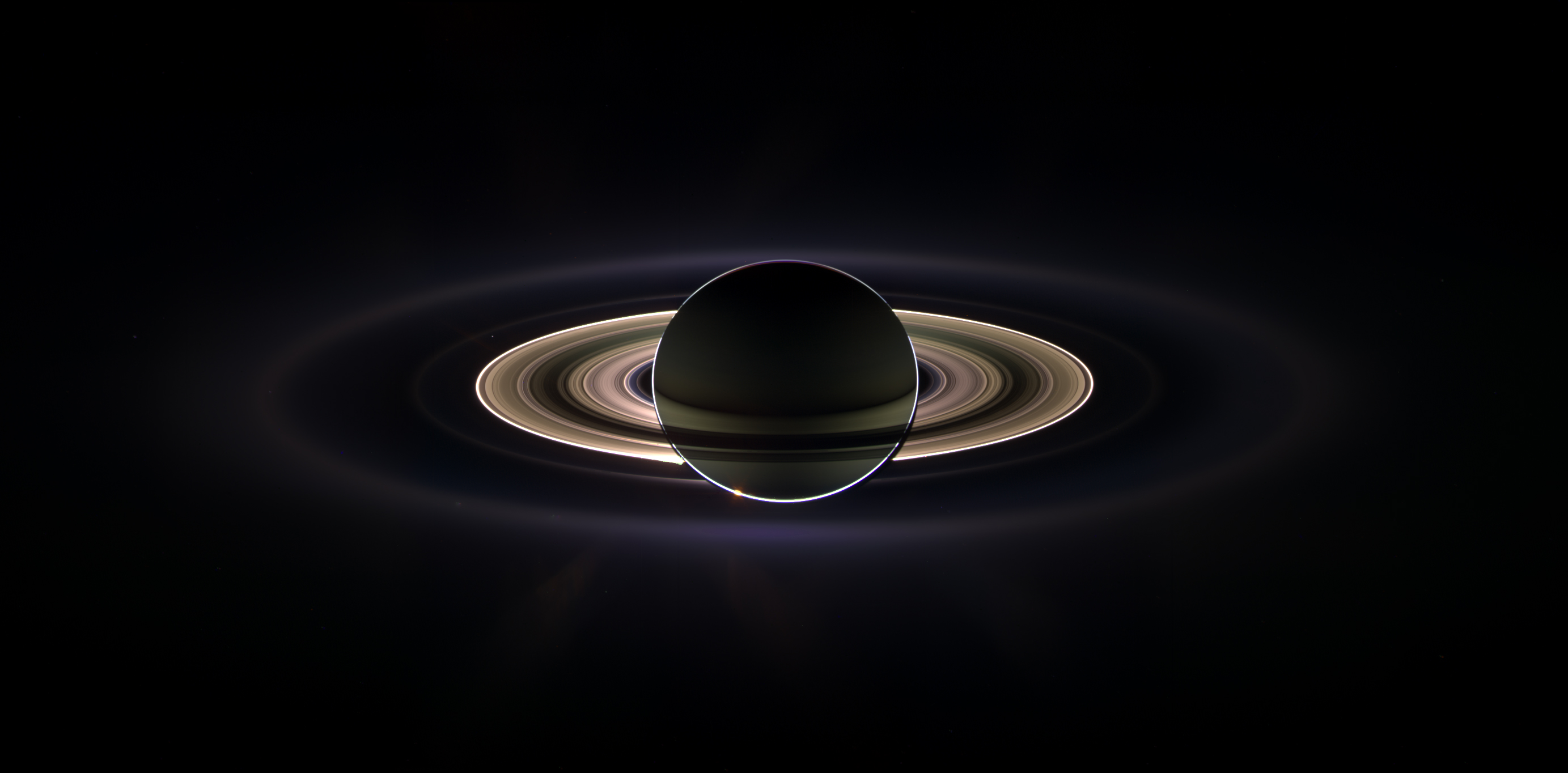
Saturn eclipses the Sun, as seen from Cassini.

Animation of Cassini's trajectory around Saturn from 1 May 2004 to 15 September 2017 Cassini · Saturn · Enceladus · Titan · Iapetus

On July 1, 2004, the Cassini–Huygens spacecraft performed the SOI (Saturn Orbit Insertion) maneuver and entered into orbit around Saturn. Before the SOI, Cassini had already studied the system extensively. In June 2004, it had conducted a close flyby of Phoebe, sending back high-resolution images and data.

The orbiter completed two Titan flybys before releasing the Huygens probe on December 25, 2004. Huygens descended onto the surface of Titan on January 14, 2005, sending a flood of data during the atmospheric descent and after the landing. During 2005 Cassini conducted multiple flybys of Titan and icy satellites.

On March 10, 2006, NASA reported that the Cassini probe found evidence of liquid water reservoirs that erupt in geysers on Saturn's moon Enceladus.

On September 20, 2006, a Cassini probe photograph revealed a previously undiscovered planetary ring, outside the brighter main rings of Saturn and inside the G and E rings.

In July 2006, Cassini saw the first proof of hydrocarbon lakes near Titan's north pole, which was confirmed in January 2007. In March 2007, additional images near Titan's north pole discovered hydrocarbon "seas", the largest of which is almost the size of the Caspian Sea.

In 2009, the probe discovered and confirmed four new satellites. Its primary mission ended in 2008, when the spacecraft completed 74 orbits around the planet. In 2010, the probe began its first extended mission, the Cassini Equinox Mission. The Cassini Solstice Mission, the second mission extension, lasted through September 2017. The mission ended on September 15, 2017, after a planned atmospheric entry into the planet Saturn.

== Future missions ==
NASA's Dragonfly spacecraft will launch in 2028 to visit the Saturn system, with the objective of landing on the moon Titan.

== Proposed missions ==
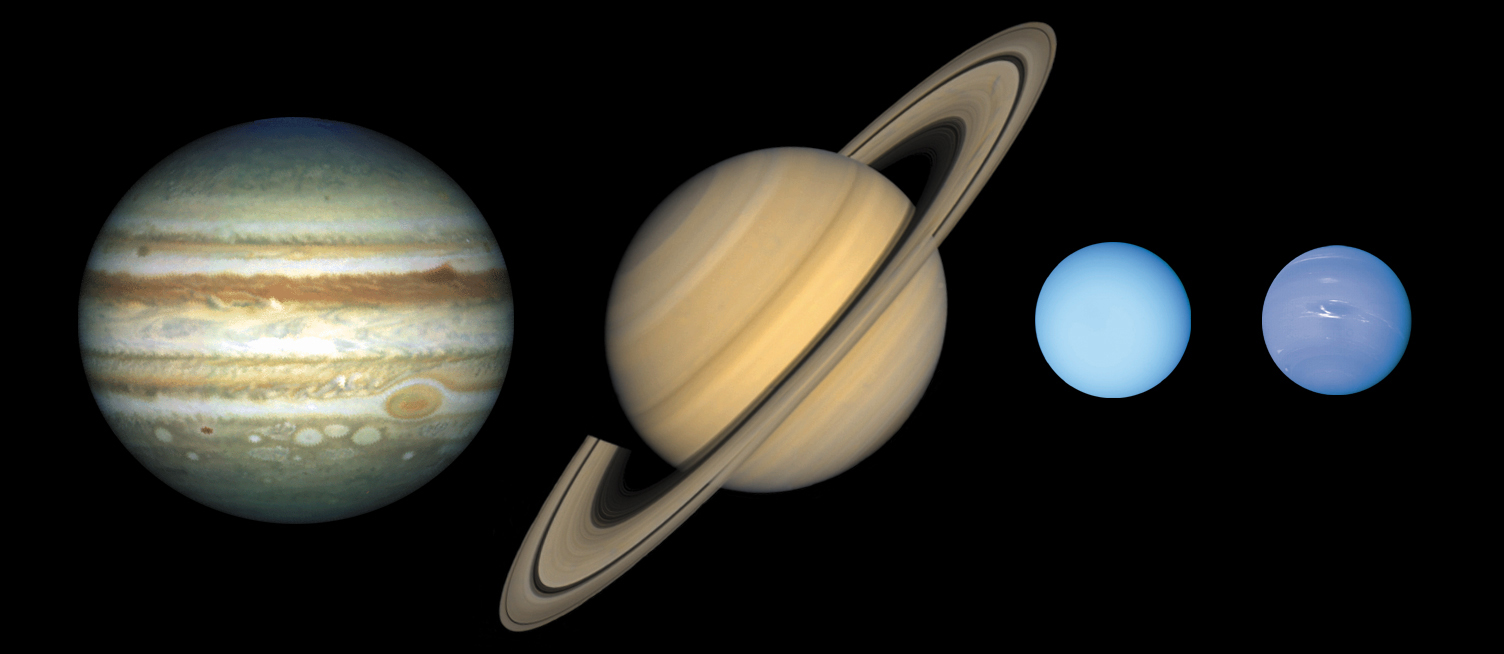
Missions to Saturn face competition from missions to other Solar System bodies

The Titan Saturn System Mission (TSSM) was a joint NASA/ESA proposal for an exploration of Saturn and its moons Titan and Enceladus, where many complex phenomena have been revealed by the recent Cassini–Huygens mission. TSSM was competing against the Europa Jupiter System Mission proposal for funding. In February 2009 it was announced that ESA/NASA had given the EJSM mission priority ahead of TSSM, although TSSM will continue to be studied for a later launch date. The Titan Saturn System Mission (TSSM) was created by the merging of the ESA's Titan and Enceladus Mission (TandEM) with NASA's Titan Explorer 2007 flagship study.

Other proposed missions to the Saturn system were:

- 2010 JPL: Journey to Enceladus and Titan (JET)
- 2011 Titan Mare Explorer (TiME); an aquatic lander that would explore the methane lakes of the moon Titan. This mission was given US$3 million in May 2011 to develop a detailed concept study as a part of the NASA Discovery program.
- 2012 DLR: Enceladus Explorer (EnEx), a lander with an ice mole.
- 2012 JPL: Life Investigation For Enceladus (LIFE) a sample-return.
- 2015 JPL: Enceladus Life Finder (ELF)
- 2020 Applied Physics Laboratory: Enceladus Orbilander

== See also ==
- Exploration of Mercury
- Exploration of Venus
- Exploration of Mars
- Exploration of Jupiter
- Exploration of Uranus
- Exploration of Neptune
- List of missions to the outer planets
