= Uranus Orbiter and Probe =

Proposed NASA space mission to Uranus

- Schematic of the 2026 concept study design for the Orbiter and Probe
- Mission type: Uranus orbiter
- Operator: NASA
- Mission duration: Cruise: 13.4 years Science phase: 4.5 years

Spacecraft properties
- Launch mass: 7,235 kg (15,950 lb)
- Dry mass: 2,756 kg (6,076 lb)
- Payload mass: Orbiter: 60.5 kg (133 lb); Atmospheric Probe: 19.7 kg (43 lb)
- Dimensions: 7.1 × 5.0 × 5.0 m (23.3 × 16.4 × 16.4 ft)
- Power: 735 W (0.986 hp) from 3 Mod1 Next-Generation Radioisotope thermoelectric generators

Start of mission
- Launch date: Not earlier than 2031
- Rocket: Proposed: Falcon Heavy (expendable)
- Launch site: Kennedy LC-39A

Flyby of Earth (gravity assist)
- Closest approach: Not earlier than 2033
- Distance: 450 km (280 mi)

Flyby of Jupiter (gravity assist)
- Closest approach: Not earlier than 2035
- Distance: 370,000 km (230,000 mi)

Uranus orbiter
- Orbital insertion: Not earlier than 2044

Uranus atmospheric probe
- Atmospheric entry: Not earlier than 2045
- Large Strategic Science Missions; Planetary Science Division Solar System Exploration program

The Uranus Orbiter and Probe is an orbiter mission concept to study Uranus and its moons. The orbiter would also deploy an atmospheric probe to characterize Uranus's atmosphere. The concept is being developed as a potential large strategic science mission for NASA. The science phase would last 4.5 years and include multiple flybys of each of the major moons.

The mission concept was selected as the highest priority Flagship-class mission by the 2023–2032 Planetary Science Decadal Survey, ahead of the Enceladus Orbilander and alongside continuing work on the NASA-ESA Mars Sample Return. A Neptune orbiter mission concept, Neptune Odyssey, that would have addressed many of the same scientific goals regarding ice giants was also considered, but for logistical and cost reasons a mission to Uranus was favored.

The original proposal targeted a launch in 2031 using a Falcon Heavy expendable launch vehicle with a gravity assist at Jupiter, allowing arrival at Uranus in 2044. In 2023, however, NASA announced that due to a shortfall in plutonium production, a mid to late 2030s launch would be more likely.

== Background ==
Voyager 2 is the only space probe to have visited the Uranus system, completing a flyby on January 24, 1986. The 2011–2022 Planetary Science Decadal Survey recommended a Flagship-class orbiter mission to an ice giant with priority behind what would become the Mars 2020 rover and the Europa Clipper. Ice giants are now appreciated as a common type of exoplanet, precipitating the need for further study of ice giants in the Solar System. The ice giants Uranus and Neptune were seen as unique yet equally compelling scientific targets, but a Uranus orbiter and atmospheric probe was given preference for logistical and cost reasons. A Uranus orbiter would logically follow Flagship-class orbiter missions undertaken at Jupiter and Saturn (Galileo and Cassini, respectively).

In 2017, prior to the 2023–2032 survey, a committee narrowed twenty mission concepts to three scenarios for Uranus and a fourth for Neptune. A mission to Neptune is viewed by some to be of greater scientific merit because Triton, likely a captured Kuiper belt object and ocean world, is a more compelling astrobiology target than the moons of Uranus (though Ariel and Miranda in particular are possible ocean worlds). There was also a study that considered a New Frontiers-level Uranus orbiter mission concept if a Flagship-class mission to Neptune were favored. Nevertheless, again due to cost and logistical considerations including launch vehicle availability and available launch windows, the 2023–2032 Planetary Science Decadal Survey recommended the Uranus Orbiter and Probe instead of an analogous proposal for Neptune, Neptune Odyssey.

== Key science questions ==
The orbiter paired with an atmospheric probe will address a variety of scientific questions across all aspects of the Uranus system:

=== Origin, interior, and atmosphere ===
- How does atmospheric circulation function, from interior to thermosphere, in an ice giant?
- What is the 3D atmospheric structure of the weather layer?
- When, where, and how did Uranus form, how did it evolve both thermally and spatially, including migration, and how did it acquire its retrograde obliquity?
- What is Uranus's bulk composition and its depth dependence?
- Does Uranus have discrete layers or a dilute core, and can this be tied to its formation and tilt?
- What is the true rotation rate of Uranus, does it rotate uniformly, and how deep are the winds?

=== Magnetosphere ===
- What dynamo process produces Uranus's complex magnetic field?
- What are the plasma sources & dynamics of Uranus's magnetosphere and how does it interact with the solar wind, Uranus's upper atmosphere, and satellite surfaces?

=== Satellites and rings ===
- What are the internal structures and rock-to-ice ratios of the large Uranian moons and which moons possess substantial internal heat sources or possible oceans?
- How do the compositions and properties of the Uranian moons constrain their formation and evolution?
- What geological history and processes do the surfaces record and how can they inform outer solar system impactor populations? What evidence of exogenic interactions do the surfaces display?
- What are the compositions, origins and history of the Uranian rings and inner small moons, and what processes sculpted them into their current configuration?

== Mission details ==
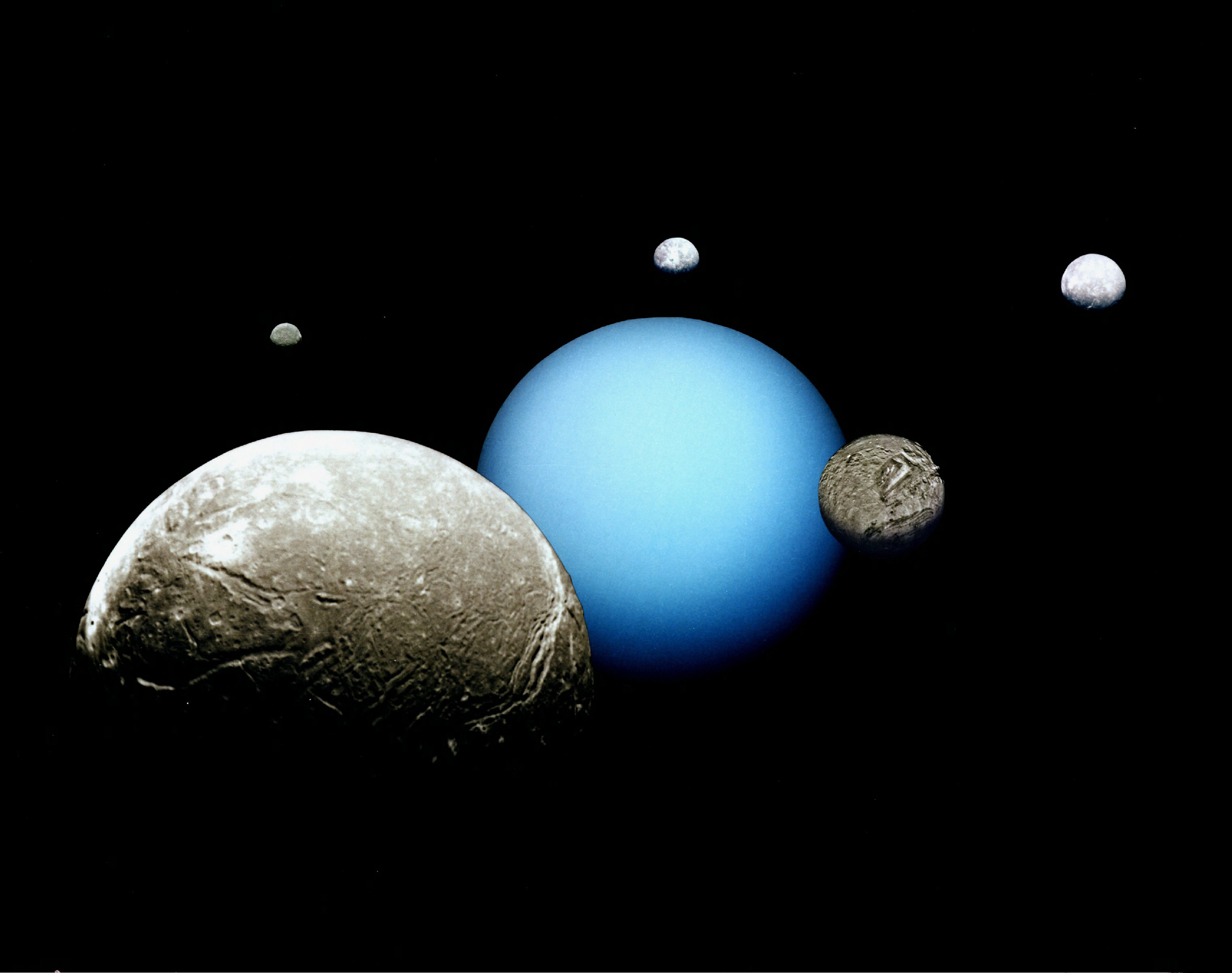
Mosaic of images of Uranus and its 5 major moons from Voyager 2

The atmospheric probe element of this mission would study the vertical distribution of cloud-forming molecules, thermal stratification, and wind speed as a function of depth. The 2010 mission design envisioned a probe of 127 kg (280 lb), less than half that of the Galileo atmospheric probe. A later design study suggested results could be significantly enhanced by adding a second probe which could be as small as 30 kg (66 lb) in mass and about 0.5 m (20 in) in diameter.

=== Orbiter instruments ===
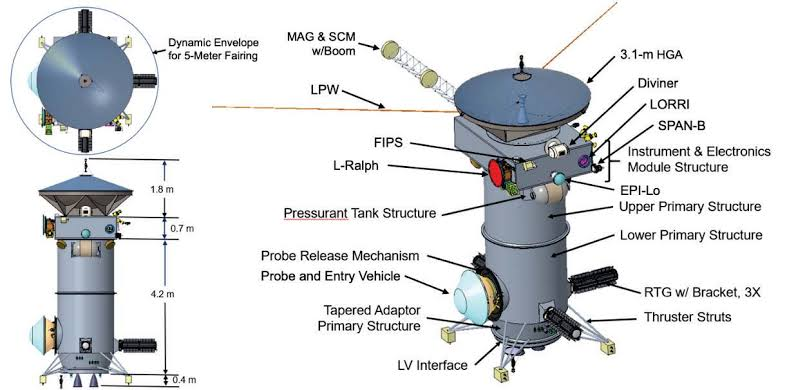
2021 concept design featuring an earlier instrument suite plan

The orbiter is proposed to carry the following instruments in the baseline concept, with additional instruments possible should they prove to be within mass, power, and cost limitations:

Instrument	Heritage Instrument	Heritage Mission
Magnetometer	MESSENGER Magnetometer	MESSENGER
Narrow-Angle Camera	Long Range Reconnaissance Imager (LORRI)	New Horizons
Thermal Infrared Camera	Diviner (radiometer)	Lunar Reconnaissance Orbiter
Langmuir Probe and Waves	MAVEN Langmuir Probe and Waves (LPW)	MAVEN
Search coil magnetometer	TRACERS search coil magnetometer (MSC)	TRACERS
Fast imaging plasma spectrometer	MESSENGER energetic particle and plasma spectrometer (EPPS)	MESSENGER
Electrostatic analyzers	Solar Wind Electrons Alphas and Protons (SWEAP)	Parker Solar Probe
Energetic Charged Particle Detector	EPI-Lo	Parker Solar Probe
Visible-Near Infrared Imaging Spectrometer & Wide-angle camera	L'Ralph	Lucy
Radio Science Experiment	UltraStable Oscillator	none (part of spacecraft communications system)

=== Atmospheric probe instruments ===
The atmospheric probe is proposed to carry 4 scientific instruments as part of the baseline concept.

Instrument	Heritage Instrument	Heritage Mission
Double focus mass spectrometer	Rosetta Orbiter Spectrometer for Ion and Neutral Analysis (ROSINA)	Rosetta
Atmospheric Structure Instrument	Huygens Atmospheric Structure Instrument (HASI)	Huygens
Ortho-Para H_{2} Detector	(in development)	none
Radio Science Experiment	UltraStable Oscillator	none (part of probe communications system)

== Challenges ==
A study by Amy Simon et al. identified several challenges and difficulties that the probe might encounter. The first challenge is slowing down when the probe finally arrives at Uranus. Because Uranus is the least massive and least dense gaseous planet in the Solar System, it also has the lowest gravity. This makes braking using Uranus's gravity less efficient and more challenging. The study suggested that the probe should use multiple flybys of Uranus's largest moon Titania to slow down because this moon has the largest mass and strongest gravity among all Uranian moons, making it the most effective moon to use when slowing down.

The next challenge identified in the article is the possibility of collisions with ring particles due to uncertainties in the structure and composition of Uranus's rings. The study suggested that the probe should enter orbit by passing between the rings and the planet. It also proposed using Uranus's atmosphere for aerobraking to minimize the use of fuel. However, the risk of striking a ring particle during this maneuver was recognized as a significant concern.

The study also identified the extreme temperature variations caused by the changing intensity of sunlight at different distances from the Sun as a potential challenge. If the Uranus Orbiter and Probe performs a flyby of Venus (at 0.7 AU), it would be exposed to nearly twice the solar heat received by Earth. In contrast, once it reaches Uranus (at 20 AU), it would receive only about 1/400 of the sunlight that Earth receives. These dramatic fluctuations in temperature could potentially damage the probe's systems.

The study also identified the extreme tilt of Uranus and its system of regular moons as another major challenge. Because the spacecraft would travel through the Solar System along a trajectory that is nearly aligned with the ecliptic plane, changing its course to match Uranus's highly inclined equatorial plane would require a substantial amount of fuel or carefully planned gravity assists. This orbital plane change — from a nearly horizontal trajectory to a highly inclined one — would be one of the mission's most demanding maneuvers.

Lastly, because there is a significant possibility that the Uranus Orbiter and Probe will not be ready to launch during the 2031–2032 window, when Jupiter and Uranus are favorably aligned for a gravity assist, the study also explored alternative propulsion technologies. These technologies could compensate for the missed launch opportunity by allowing the spacecraft to travel directly to Uranus while minimizing or eliminating the need for planetary gravity assists.

== See also ==
- Atmosphere of Uranus
- Exploration of Uranus
- Moons of Uranus

Uranus mission proposals

- MUSE
- OCEANUS (New Frontiers-class proposal of the 2010s)
- ODINUS
- Uranus Pathfinder (ESA M-Class proposal of the 2010s)
