= MUSE (spacecraft) =

Proposed European space mission to Uranus

Mission to Uranus for Science and Exploration (MUSE)
- Mission type: Reconnaissance, atmospheric probe
- Operator: European Space Agency

Spacecraft properties
- Spacecraft: MUSE
- Launch mass: 4,219 kg (9,301 lb)
- Dry mass: 2,073 kg (4,570 lb)
- Payload mass: Orbiter: 252 kg (556 lb); Probe: 150 kg (330 lb)
- Dimensions: cylindrical bus 3 m × 1.6 m
- Power: 436 W Li-ion batteries: 3,376 Wh; Generator: four ASRGs

Start of mission
- Launch date: September 2026 (proposed); November 2029 (if delayed)
- Rocket: Ariane 6 (proposed)

Uranus orbiter
- Orbital insertion: 2044 (proposed); 2049 (if delayed)
- Orbits: 36

Uranus atmospheric probe
- Spacecraft component: Entry probe
- Atmospheric entry: 2044 (proposed)2049(if delayed

MUSE (Mission to Uranus for Science and Exploration) is a European proposal for a dedicated mission to the planet Uranus to study its atmosphere, interior, moons, rings, and magnetosphere. It is proposed to be launched with an Ariane 6 in 2026, travel for 16.5 years to reach Uranus in 2044, and would operate until 2050.

The European Space Operations Centre would monitor and control the mission, as well as generate and provide the raw data sets. In 2012, the cost was estimated at €1.8 billion. The mission addresses the themes of the ESA Cosmic Vision 2015–2025. This was designed as an L-Class flagship level mission; however, it is constrained by the need for RTGs. MUSE was also analyzed in the US as an Enhanced New Frontiers class mission in 2014.

== Orbiter ==
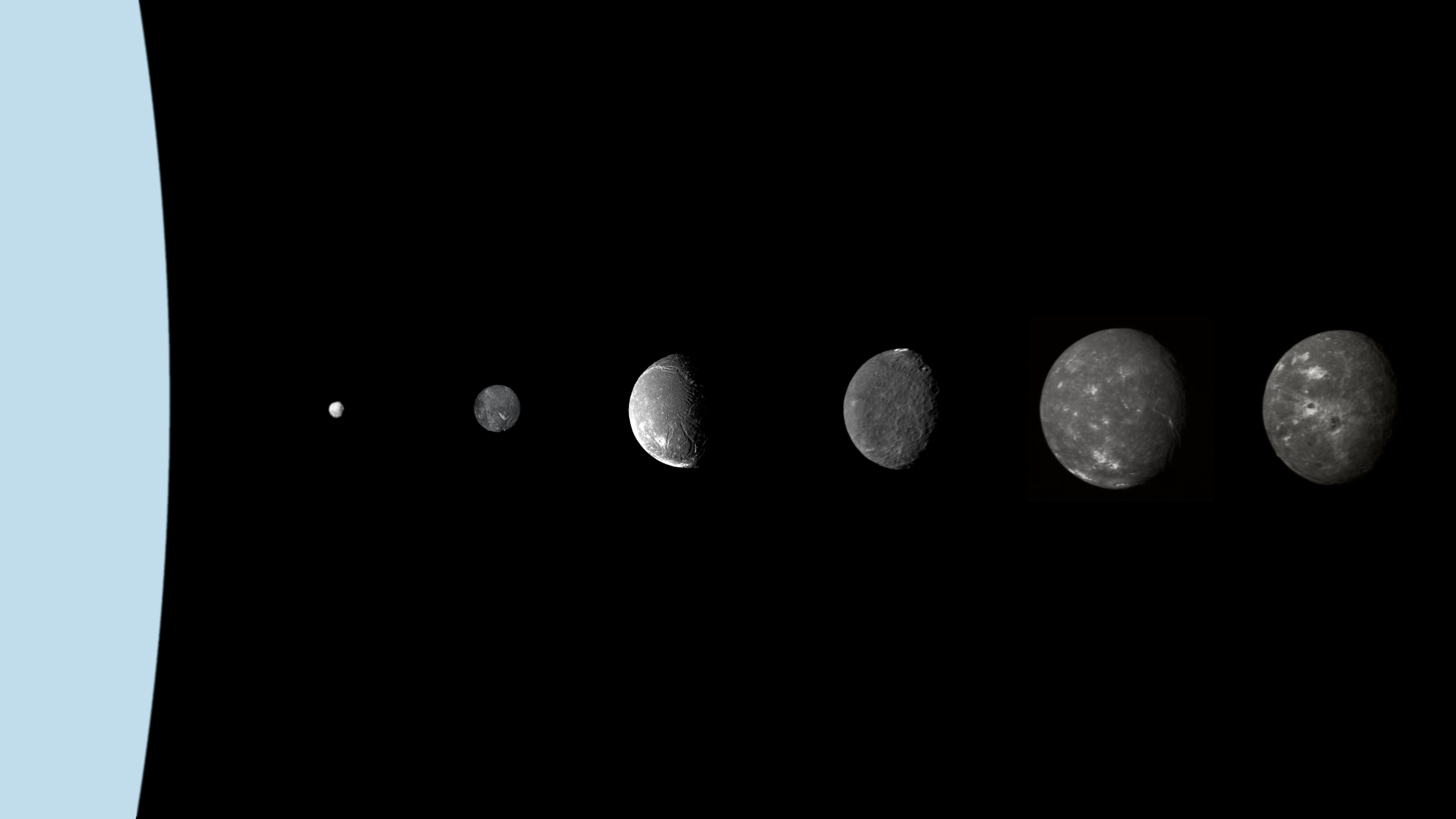
Uranus and its six largest moons compared at their proper relative sizes and relative positions. From left to right: Puck, Miranda, Ariel, Umbriel, Titania, and Oberon

The orbiter science phase would consist of the Uranus Science Orbit (USO) phase of approximately 2 years in a highly elliptic polar orbit to provide best gravimetry data, during which 36 Uranus orbits are performed.

Subsequently, the orbiter will continue to the Moon Tour (MT) phase, which would last three years. During this phase, the periapsis would be raised, facilitating nine flybys of each of Uranus' five major moons: Miranda, Ariel, Umbriel, Titania, and Oberon.

Because of the long distance from the Sun (20 AU on average), the orbiter would not be able to use solar panels, requiring instead four Advanced Stirling Radioisotope Generators (ASRGs) to be developed by ESA. The propulsion system for the Earth-Uranus transfer would be chemical: Monomethylhydrazine and Mixed Oxides of Nitrogen (MMH/MON) propellant combination is used.

== Atmospheric probe ==
Understanding why Uranus emits such a small amount of heat can only be done in the context of thermodynamic modeling of the atmosphere (density, pressure, and temperature). Therefore, the atmosphere needs to be characterized from both a composition and a thermodynamic point of view. The chemical information to retrieve is the elemental concentrations, especially of disequilibrium species, isotopic ratios and noble gases, in combination with information regarding the distribution of aerosol particles with depth.

Twenty days before entry, the atmospheric probe would separate from the spacecraft and enter the outer atmosphere of Uranus at an altitude of 700 km at 21.8 km/s. It would descend by free fall and perform atmospheric measurements for about 90 minutes down to a maximum of 100 bars (1,500 psi) pressure.

== Proposed instruments ==
The total mass budget for scientific instruments is 150 kg (330 lb); if all of proposed instruments are selected, they would sum a total payload mass of 108.4 kg (239 lb). In the table below, a green background denotes instruments to go on the entry probe; the rest are for the orbiter.

Instrument	Description	Dimension, range, resolution	Heritage
VINIRS	Visible and Near Infrared Spectrometer	Electromagnetic radiation: λ: 0.25–5 μm 96 bands (1.8 nm per band)	Dawn VIR
IRS	Thermal Infrared Spectrometer	Electromagnetic radiation: λ: 7.16–16.67 μm 1×10 array of 0.273 mrad squares	Cassini CIRS
UVIS	Ultraviolet Imaging Spectrograph	Electromagnetic radiation: λ: 55.8–190 nm	Cassini UVIS
RPW	Radio and Plasma Wave Instrument	Electromagnetic radiation and plasma waves: 1 Hz–16 MHz (various channels)	Cassini RPWS
MAG	Fluxgate Magnetometer	Magnetic fields: 0–20000 nT; Dual 3-axis <1 nT accuracy	Juno MAG; Swarm VFM
TELFA	TLF and ELF Antenna	Electromagnetic radiation: Schumann resonances	C/NOFS VEFI antennas
ICI	Ion Composition Instrument	Positive ions: 25 eV–40 keV (dE/E = 0.07)	Rosetta ICA
IES	Ion and Electron Sensor	Electrons and ions: 1 eV/e–22 keV/e (dE/E = 0.04)	Rosetta IES
EPD	Energetic Particle Detector	Particles (free solar wind and those contained in Van Allen radiation belts): Protons: 15 keV–3 MeV; Alphas: 25 keV–3 MeV; CNO: 60 keV–30 MeV; Electrons: 15 keV–1 MeV	New Horizons PEPSSI
NAC	Narrow Angle Camera	Electromagnetic radiation: 350–1050 nm 6 μrad/pixel	Cassini ISS
WAC	Wide Angle Camera	Electromagnetic radiation: 350–1050 nm 60 μrad/pixel	Cassini ISS
RSE	Radio Science Experiment	Allan variance of radio oscillators: T = 100 s of 1×10^{−13} Transponders operating at S, X and K_{a} band	Cassini RSS
MWR	Microwave Radiometer	Electromagnetic radiation: 0.6–22 GHz; Gain up to 80 dB; Determines temperature profile down to 200 bar atmospheric pressure	Juno MWR
DC	Dust Analyzer	Interplanetary dust particles: 10^{−15}–10^{−9} kg 1–10 μm (radius)	Cassini CDA; New Horizons SDC
DWE	Doppler Wind Experiment	Velocity of wind: Resolution of 1 m/s Determines wind profile down to 20 bar atmospheric pressure	Huygens DWE
AP3	Atmospheric Physical Properties Package	Temperature, pressure and density profiles: Depth: 0–20 bar	Huygens HASI
GCMS	Gas Chromatograph and Mass Spectrometer	Atoms and compounds: Heavy elements, noble gases, key isotopic ratios (H_{2}/He, D/H, PH_{3}, CO) and disequilibrium species	Huygens GCMS
AS & NEP	Aerosol Sampling System and Nephelometer	Atmospheric particle size: 0.2–20 μm (radius); Works at concentrations up to 1 cm³	Huygens ACP; Galileo GPNE

== MUSE as new New Frontiers mission ==
In 2014, a paper was released considering MUSE under the constraints of an enhanced New Frontiers mission. This included a cost cap of US$1.5 billion, and one of the big differences was the use of an Atlas V 551 rocket.

== See also ==
- Atmosphere of Uranus
- Exploration of Uranus
- Moons of Uranus

Uranus mission proposals

- ODINUS
- NASA Uranus orbiter and probe
- Oceanus
- Uranus Pathfinder
