= Uranus Pathfinder =

Space mission concept

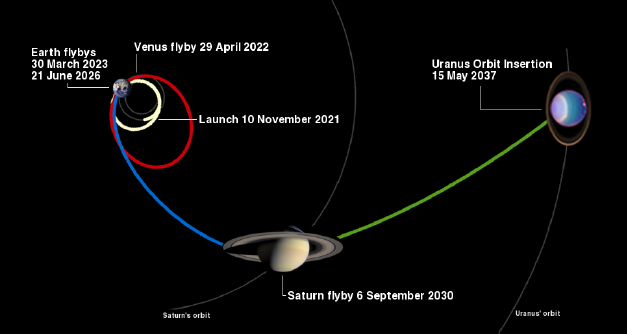
A trajectory of Uranus Pathfinder.

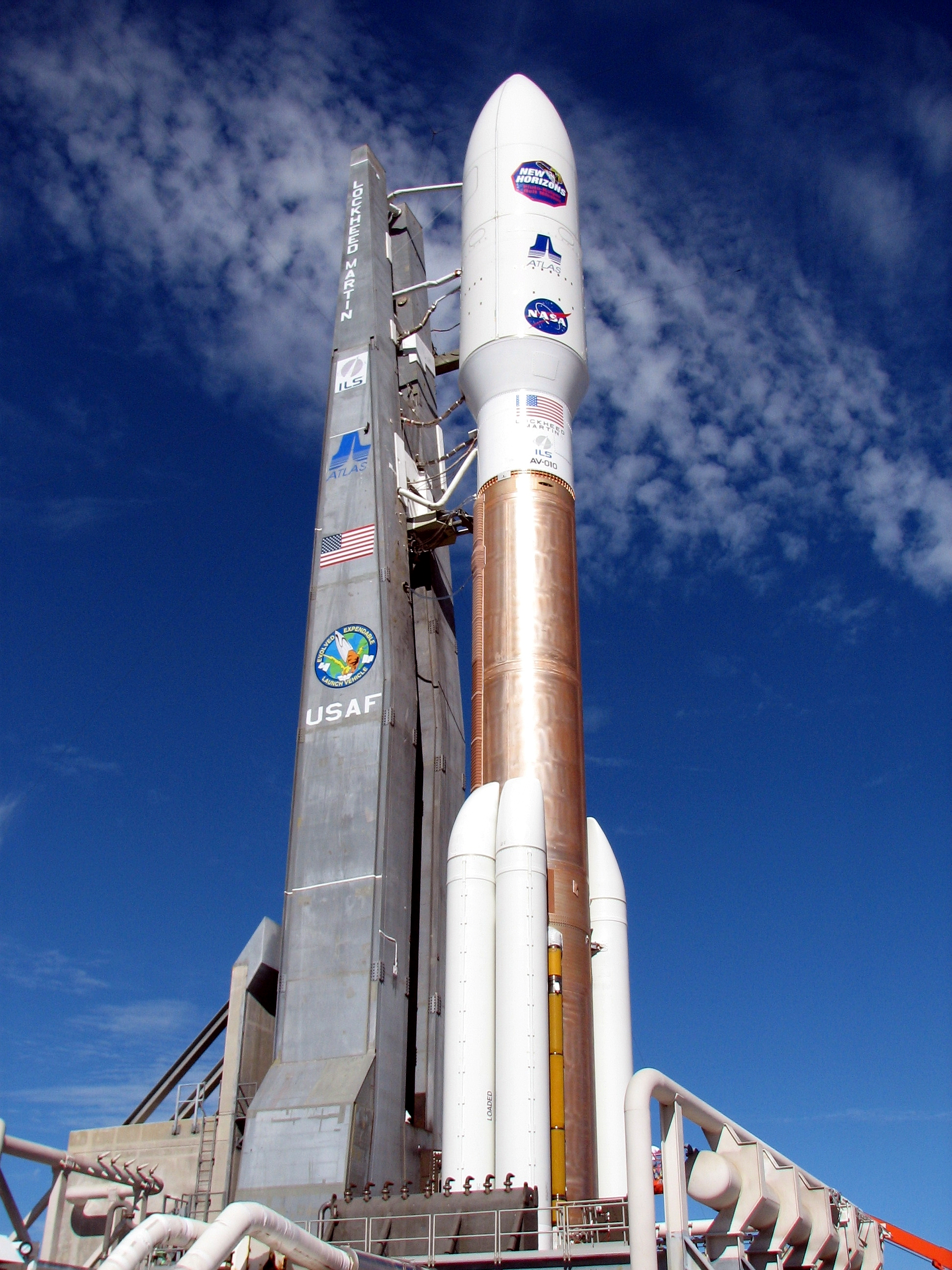
Atlas V rocket.

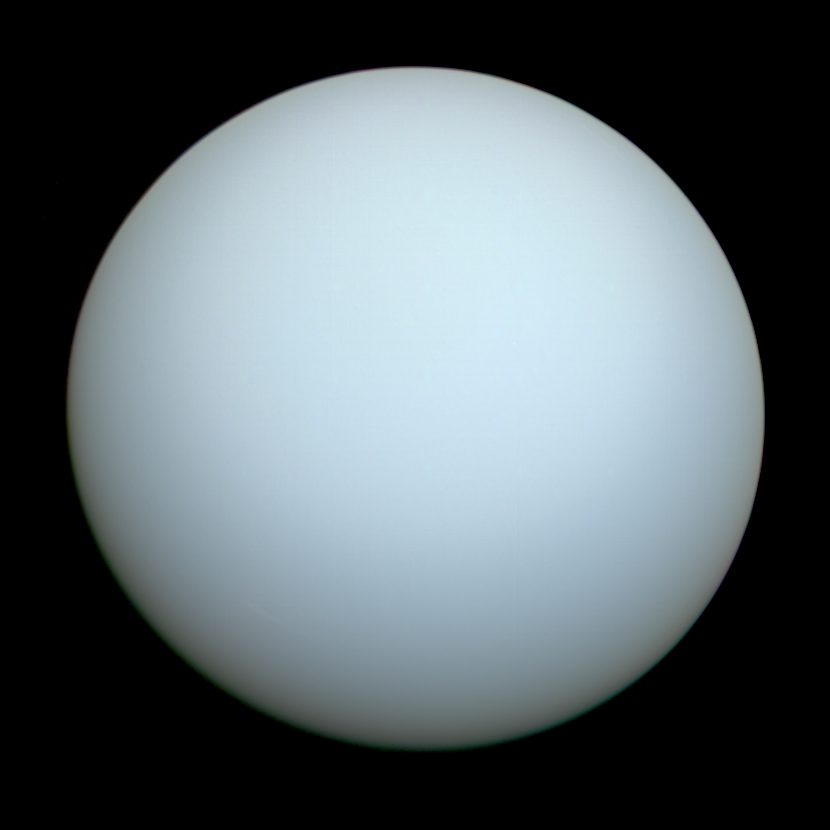
Uranus

Uranus Pathfinder was a mission concept for the Uranian system evaluated in the 2010s by the European Space Agency.

== History ==
In 2011, scientists from the Mullard Space Science Laboratory in the United Kingdom proposed the joint NASA–ESA Uranus Pathfinder mission to Uranus. It would have been a medium-class (M-class) mission to be launched in 2022, and was submitted to the ESA in December 2010 with the signatures of 120 scientists from around the globe. ESA caps the cost of M-class missions at €470 million. Uranus Pathfinder was proposed in support of ESA's Cosmic Vision 2015–2025. The mission study including several possible combinations of launch dates, trajectories, and flybys (gravity assists), including flybys of Earth, Venus, and of the planet Saturn. Indeed, the study noted the velocity change requirements are only marginally higher than for typical missions to Saturn of this period.

In the baseline concept, UP is an ESA–NASA bilateral mission and it would launch on an Atlas V 551 in January 2025 on a Venus–Earth–Earth interplanetary transfer to Uranus, reaching Uranus orbit in November 2037 after a cruise phase lasting 12.8 years.

It would orbit Uranus in a highly eccentric 45-day polar science orbit, with close periapsis distances to Uranus to make high-fidelity measurements of Uranus's gravitational and magnetic fields.

The scientific payload has a strong heritage in Europe and beyond and includes: a narrow-angle camera, visible/near-IR imaging spectrometer, thermal IR bolometer, radio science, magnetometer, radio and plasma wave detector, and plasma detector.

The mission would use the Earth communication stations at New Norcia (X band), and Cebreros (X and K_{a} bands) during its long cruise to the Uranian system.

Possible flyby/gravity assist combinations studied:

- VVE (Venus–Venus–Earth)
- VEE
- EVVE
- VEES (Venus–Earth–Earth–Saturn)
- VVEES

For power, the proposal suggests using a European radioisotope thermoelectric generator based on americium-241, with NASA's MMRTG and ASRG mentioned as possible backup options, which would provide more power.

== See also ==
- Atmosphere of Uranus
- Exploration of Uranus
- Moons of Uranus

Uranus mission proposals

- MUSE
- Oceanus
- ODINUS
- Uranus orbiter and probe
