= Exploration of Uranus =

Overview of the exploration of the planet Uranus and its moons

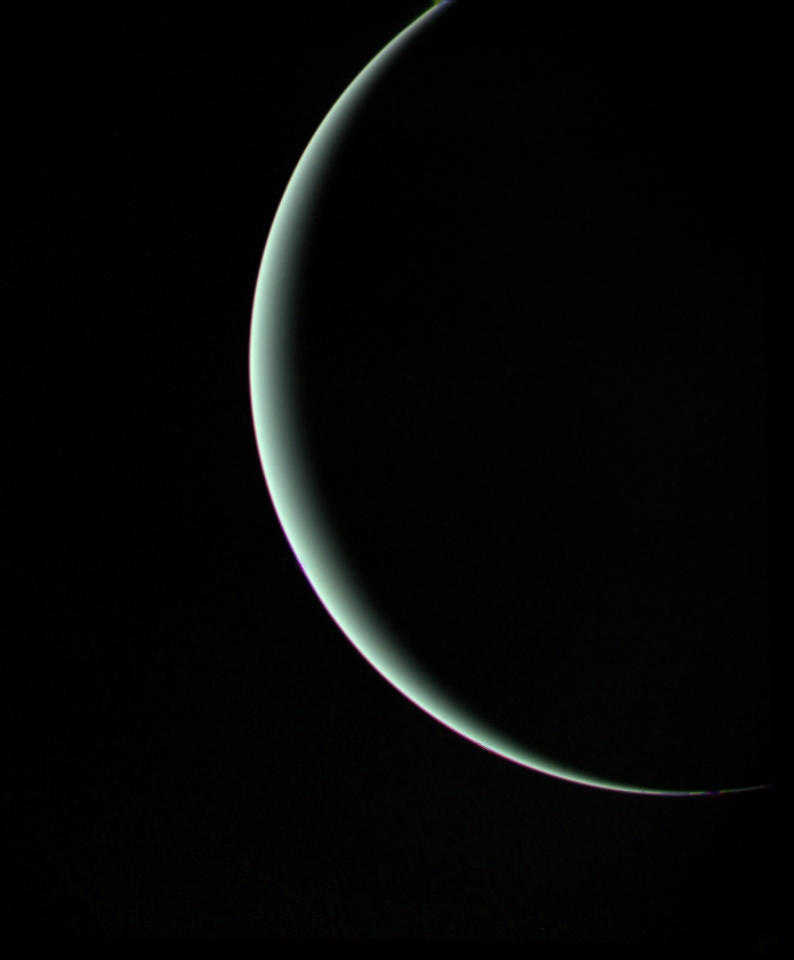
Uranus as seen by Voyager 2 in 1986, during its journey toward Neptune

The exploration of Uranus has been limited to telescopic observations and a single spacecraft visit by NASA's Voyager 2, which made its closest approach to the planet on January 24, 1986. The spacecraft discovered 10 moons, studied Uranus's cold atmosphere and magnetic field, and examined its ring system, discovering two additional rings. It also imaged the planet's five largest moons, revealing surfaces marked by impact craters, faults, and canyons.

Several missions to Uranus have been proposed by space agencies and research teams, including orbiters and atmospheric probes. The 2023–2032 Planetary Science Decadal Survey ranked a Uranus orbiter and probe as NASA's highest-priority Flagship-class planetary science mission. However, no dedicated mission to Uranus has been approved.

== Voyager 2 ==
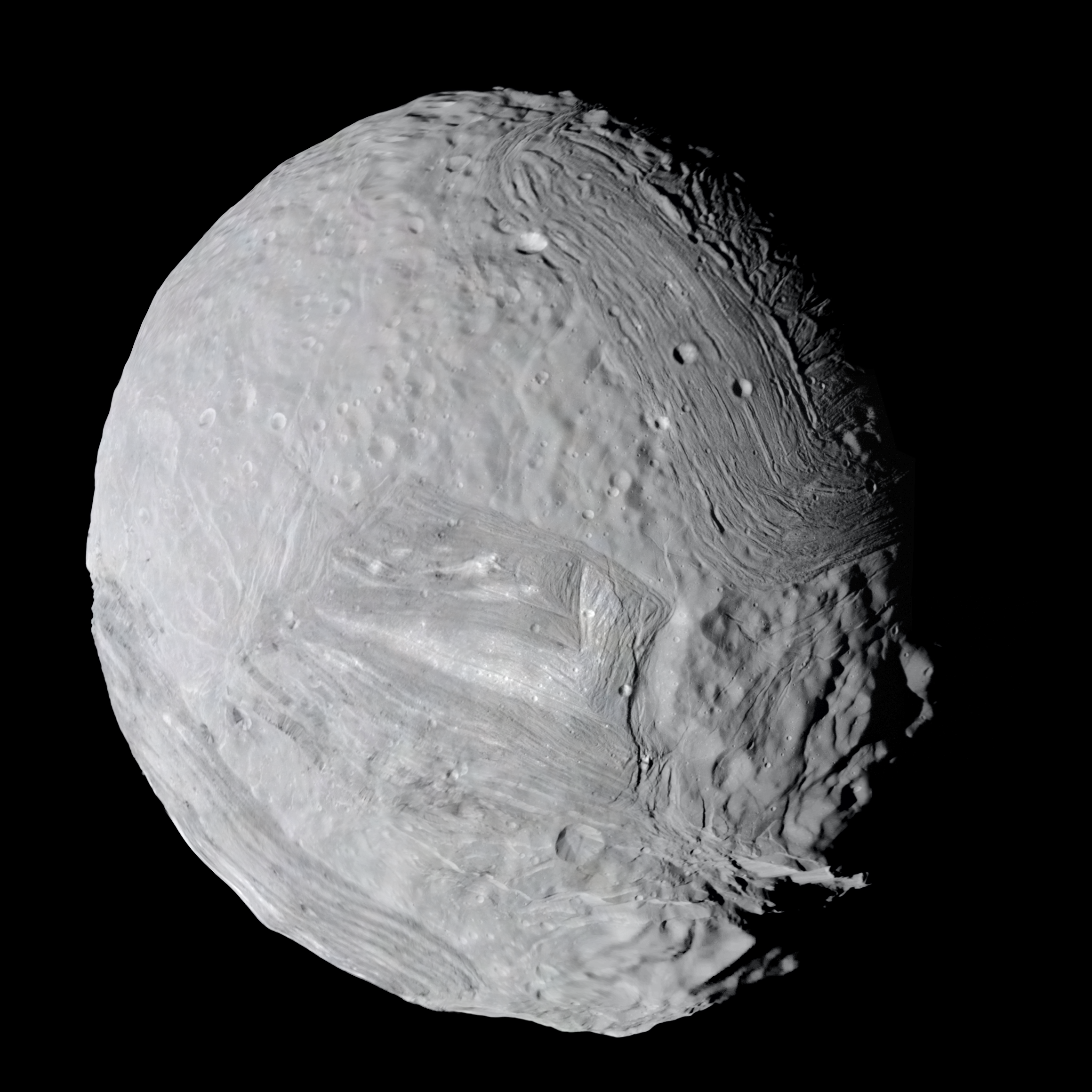
Miranda, one of Uranus's moons, as imaged by Voyager 2

Voyager 2 made its closest approach to Uranus on January 24, 1986, passing within 81,500 km (50,600 mi) of the planet's cloud tops. This was the spacecraft's first solo planetary flyby, as Voyager 1 had ended its tour of the outer planets at Saturn's moon Titan.

Voyager 2 measured Uranus's rotation period as 17 hours and 14 minutes. The planet has an axial tilt of 97.77°, causing it to rotate nearly on its side. Its polar regions experience prolonged periods of sunlight and darkness. Because Voyager 2 arrived near the planet's solstice, scientists were uncertain what conditions they would encounter.

The existence of Uranus's magnetic field was not confirmed until Voyager 2 arrived. The field's strength is roughly comparable to Earth's, but its center is significantly offset from the planet's center, causing its intensity to vary considerably across the planet. Its unusual orientation suggests that the field is generated at an intermediate depth within Uranus, where high pressure may make water electrically conductive. Voyager 2 also found that the planet's unusual orientation affects its magnetotail, which extends behind the planet and is tilted about 60° relative to its rotation axis. The planet's rotation twists the magnetotail into a long, corkscrew-shaped structure.

Uranus's radiation belts were found to have an intensity comparable to those of Saturn. Radiation within the belts can rapidly darken methane trapped in the icy surfaces of the inner moons and particles in the rings, potentially within 100,000 years. This process may have contributed to the dark appearance of the moons and ring particles, which are almost uniformly gray.

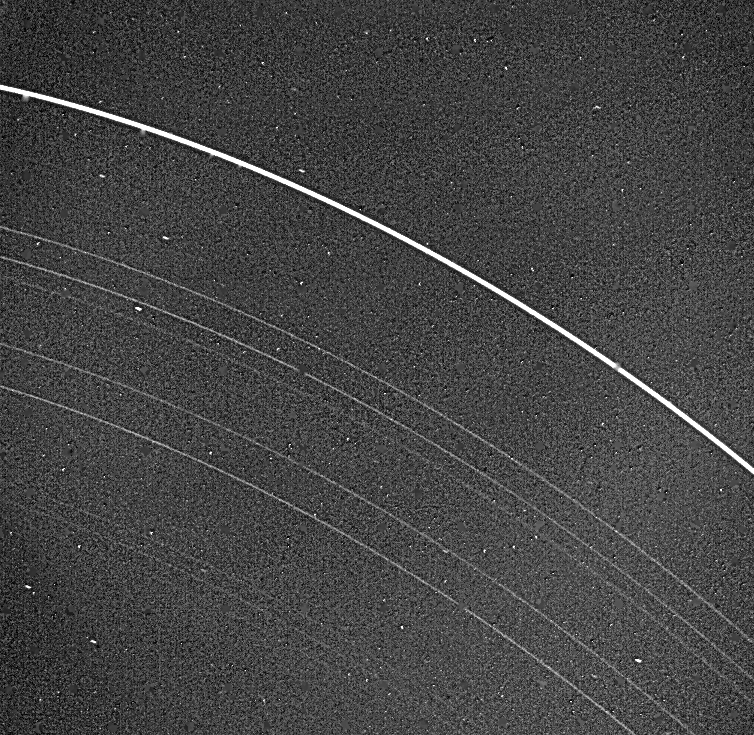
Uranus's faint, dark rings as imaged by Voyager 2

Voyager 2 detected a high-altitude haze around the sunlit pole, which also emitted substantial amounts of ultraviolet radiation in a phenomenon known as dayglow. The planet's average atmospheric temperature is about 60 K (−213.2 °C; −351.7 °F). Despite the differences in sunlight received by the illuminated and dark poles, the spacecraft found that the cloud-top temperatures were nearly uniform across the planet.

Voyager 2 discovered 10 moons, bringing the known total to 15 at the time. Most of the newly discovered moons were small, with the largest measuring about 150 km (93 mi) in diameter.

The spacecraft's images revealed that Miranda, the innermost of Uranus's five large moons, is one of the most unusual bodies in the Solar System. Detailed images showed large oval structures known as coronae, faults as deep as 20 km (12 mi), terraced layers, and a mixture of older and younger surface features. One hypothesis proposes that Miranda formed from the reassembly of material after an earlier violent impact shattered the moon.

The five large moons appear to consist of mixtures of ice and rock, similar to Saturn's major satellites. Titania has extensive fault systems and canyons that indicate past geological activity, probably involving tectonic processes. Ariel has the brightest and possibly youngest surface of Uranus's major moons. Its surface features include numerous fault valleys and structures that may be extensive flows of icy material, suggesting past geological activity. By contrast, Umbriel and Oberon show little evidence of geological activity, judging from their old, dark surfaces.

Voyager 2 studied all nine previously known rings and found that Uranus's ring system differs significantly from those of Jupiter and Saturn. The rings may be relatively young and may have formed after Uranus itself. Their particles could be remnants of a moon destroyed by a high-velocity impact or disrupted by gravitational forces. The spacecraft also discovered two additional rings.

In March 2020, NASA astronomers reported that a reanalysis of data recorded by Voyager 2 had revealed a large magnetic bubble, known as a plasmoid, that may be carrying material from Uranus's atmosphere into space.

== Proposed missions ==
A number of missions to Uranus have been proposed, including orbiters and atmospheric probes.

Scientists at the Mullard Space Science Laboratory in the United Kingdom proposed the joint NASA–European Space Agency (ESA) Uranus Pathfinder mission. In December 2010, 120 scientists from around the world signed a proposal submitted to the ESA for a medium-class (M-class) mission to Uranus, with a planned launch in 2022. The ESA caps the cost of M-class missions at €470 million.

In 2009, a team of planetary scientists at NASA's Jet Propulsion Laboratory developed possible designs for a solar-powered Uranus orbiter. The most favorable launch window would have been in August 2018, with arrival at Uranus in September 2030. The proposed science package included magnetometers, particle detectors, and possibly an imaging camera.

In 2010, scientists at the Applied Physics Laboratory proposed the Herschel Orbital Reconnaissance of the Uranian System probe. The concept was heavily influenced by the New Horizons probe and called for a launch in April 2021.

In 2011, the United States National Research Council's Planetary Science Decadal Survey recommended a Uranus orbiter and probe as the third-highest priority for a NASA Flagship mission. The mission ranked below proposed missions to Mars and the Jovian system, which later became Mars 2020 and Europa Clipper, respectively.

A Uranus mission has also been proposed as a possible use for an uncrewed variant of NASA's Space Launch System (SLS), a heavy-lift launch vehicle. The SLS was reported to be capable of sending up to 1.7 t (3,700 lb) of payload to Uranus.

In 2013, researchers proposed using an electric sail (E-Sail) to send an atmospheric entry probe to Uranus.

In 2015, NASA announced a feasibility study into possible orbital missions to Uranus and Neptune, with a proposed budget of US$2 billion in 2015 dollars. NASA planetary science director Jim Green, who initiated the study, said that the missions could launch in the late 2020s at the earliest. Their development would depend on support from the planetary science community and NASA's ability to provide nuclear power sources for the spacecraft. Conceptual designs for the missions were also under analysis.

MUSE, conceived in 2012 and proposed in 2015, is a European mission concept designed to study Uranus's atmosphere, interior, moons, rings, and magnetosphere. The proposal called for a launch aboard an Ariane 5 rocket in 2026, arrival at Uranus in 2044, and operations through 2050.

In 2016, researchers developed another mission concept, the Origins and Composition of the Exoplanet Analog Uranus System (OCEANUS). They presented it in 2017 as a candidate for a future New Frontiers program mission. Around the same time, students at Purdue University proposed a Flagship-class version of OCEANUS. It featured more than twice as many instruments in a more compact design, a larger high-gain antenna, and two atmospheric probes, intended for Saturn and Uranus, rather than the original concept's single Uranus probe.

In 2020, researchers proposed QUEST (Quest to Uranus to Explore Solar System Theories), a New Frontiers-class mission concept. Its authors described it as more feasible than earlier proposals. The concept called for a launch in 2032, a Jupiter gravity assist in 2036, and arrival at Uranus in 2045. The spacecraft would then enter an elliptical polar orbit around the planet, with a periapsis about 1.1 times Uranus's radius. It would have a dry mass of 1,210 kg (2,670 lb) and carry four scientific instruments: a magnetometer, microwave radiometer, wide-angle camera, and plasma wave detector.

In October 2021, a team composed mostly of staff from the Jet Propulsion Laboratory and Ames Research Center proposed another New Frontiers-class mission, the Uranian Magnetosphere and Moons Investigator. The team recommended a launch in the late 2040s.

In 2022, the 2023–2032 Planetary Science Decadal Survey ranked the Uranus orbiter and probe mission as NASA's highest-priority Flagship mission. The recommendation placed it ahead of the proposed Enceladus Orbilander and the ongoing Mars Sample Return program, citing the limited scientific knowledge of ice giants. The mission's design had most recently been updated in June 2021.

In July 2023, in response to the decadal survey's recommendation, a team at the Johns Hopkins University Applied Physics Laboratory proposed a Uranus orbiter called PERSEUS (Plasma Environment, Radiation, Structure, and Evolution of the Uranian System). The mission would focus primarily on Uranus's plasma and magnetic environment and its relationship to heliophysics. The proposed launch date was February 2031, with arrival in mid-2043. The spacecraft's estimated dry mass was 913.1 kg (2,013 lb).

Launch opportunities for missions to Uranus are available between 2030 and 2034.

The China National Space Administration's (CNSA) Tianwen-4 mission, scheduled to launch in 2029, is planned to include a subprobe that will separate from the Jupiter orbiter and use a gravity assist to fly past Uranus in March 2045 before continuing into interstellar space. China has also considered a potential Tianwen-5 mission to orbit either Uranus or Neptune, but no such mission has yet been approved.

== See also ==
- Exploration of Mercury
- Exploration of Venus
- Exploration of Mars
- Exploration of Jupiter
- Exploration of Saturn
- Exploration of Neptune

== Bibliography ==
- "Uranus Science Results". Voyager Science Results at Uranus. NASA.
- Stone, E. C.; Miner, E. D. (1986). "The Voyager 2 Encounter with the Uranian System". Science. 233 (4759): 39–43. Bibcode:1986Sci...233...39S. doi:10.1126/science.233.4759.39. PMID 17812888. S2CID 32861151.
- Rick, Gore (1986). "Uranus Voyager visits a dark planet". National Geographic. 170 (2): 178–195. Bibcode:1986NaGe..170..178G.
