= Exploration of Neptune =

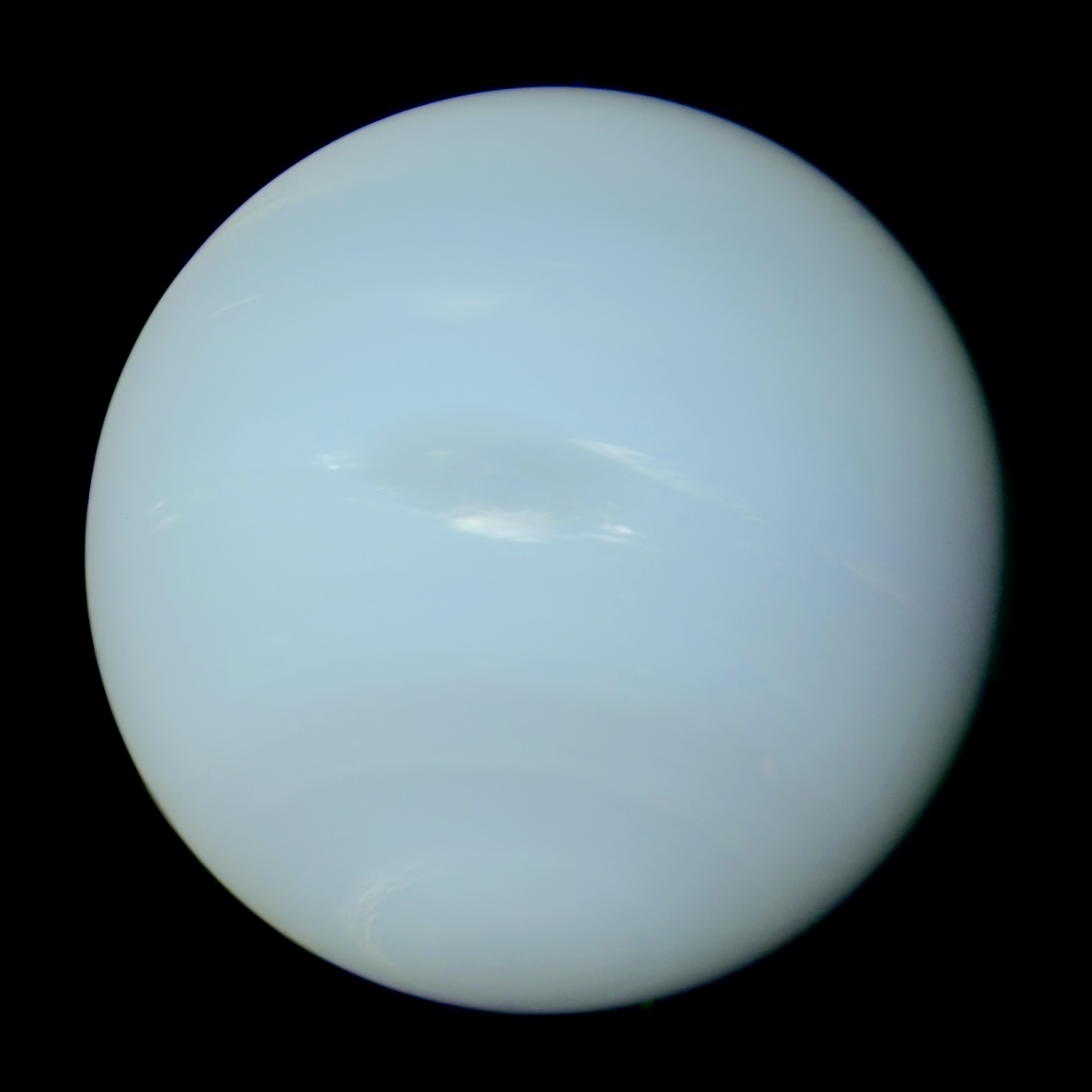
Photograph of Neptune in true colour by Voyager 2 in 1989. (Note: Based on Irwin, Patrick G J; Dobinson, Jack; James, Arjuna; Teanby, Nicholas A; Simon, Amy A; Fletcher, Leigh N; Roman, Michael T; Orton, Glenn S; Wong, Michael H; Toledo, Daniel; Pérez-Hoyos, Santiago; Beck, Julie (2023-12-23). "Modelling the seasonal cycle of Uranus's colour and magnitude, and comparison with Neptune". Monthly Notices of the Royal Astronomical Society. 527 (4): 11521–11538. doi:10.1093/mnras/stad3761. hdl:20.500.11850/657542. ISSN 0035-8711.) Neptune's south pole is slightly above the bottom of the image.

Neptune has been directly explored by one space probe, Voyager 2, in 1989. As of 2026, there are no confirmed future missions to visit the Neptunian system. NASA, ESA, CNSA and independent academic groups have proposed future scientific missions to visit Neptune. Some mission plans are still active, while others have been abandoned or put on hold.

Since the mid-1990s, Neptune has been studied from afar with telescopes, including the Hubble Space Telescope and the ground-based Keck telescope using adaptive optics.

== Voyager 2 ==
Voyager 2 image of Triton in true colour.

After Voyager 2 visited Saturn successfully, it was decided to fund further missions to Uranus and Neptune. These missions were conducted by the Jet Propulsion Laboratory, and the Neptunian mission was dubbed "Voyager Neptune Interstellar Mission". Voyager 2 started taking navigation images of Neptune in May 1988. Voyager 2's observation phase proper of Neptune began 5 June 1989, the spacecraft officially reached the Neptunian system on 25 August, and data collection ceased on 2 October. Initially it was planned to use a trajectory that resulted in Voyager 2 passing around 1,300 km (810 mi) from Neptune and 8,200 km (5,100 mi) from Triton. The need to avoid ring material detected by stellar occultations prompted this trajectory to be abandoned, and a trajectory that largely avoided the rings but resulted in more distant flybys of both targets was plotted.

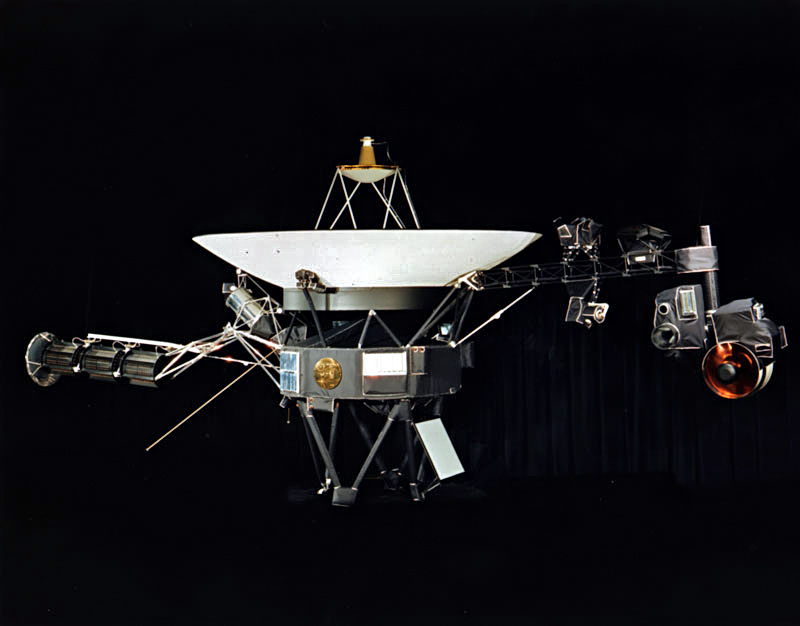
Voyager 2 spacecraft

On 25 August, in Voyager 2's last planetary encounter, the spacecraft swooped only 4,950 km (3,080 mi) above Neptune's north pole, the closest approach it had made to any body since it left Earth in 1977. At that time, Neptune was the farthest known body in the Solar System. It would not be until 1999 that Pluto would move further from the Sun in its trajectory. Voyager 2 studied Neptune's atmosphere, Neptune's rings, its magnetosphere, and Neptune's moons. The Neptunian system had been studied scientifically for many years with telescopes and indirect methods, but the close inspection by the Voyager 2 probe settled many issues and revealed a plethora of information that could not have been obtained otherwise. The data from Voyager 2 are still the best data available on this planet in most cases.

The exploration mission revealed that Neptune's atmosphere is very dynamic, even though it receives only three percent of the sunlight that Jupiter receives. Winds on Neptune were found to be the strongest in the Solar System, up to three times stronger than Jupiter's and nine times stronger than the strongest winds on Earth. Most winds blew westward, opposite the planet's rotation. Separate cloud decks were discovered, with cloud systems emerging and dissolving within hours and giant storms circling the entire planet within sixteen to eighteen hours in the upper layers. Voyager 2 discovered an anticyclone dubbed the Great Dark Spot, similar to Jupiter's Great Red Spot. However, images taken by the Hubble Space Telescope in 1994 revealed that the Great Dark Spot had disappeared. Also seen in Neptune's upper atmosphere was an almond-shaped spot designated D2 and a bright, quickly moving cloud high above the cloud decks dubbed "Scooter".

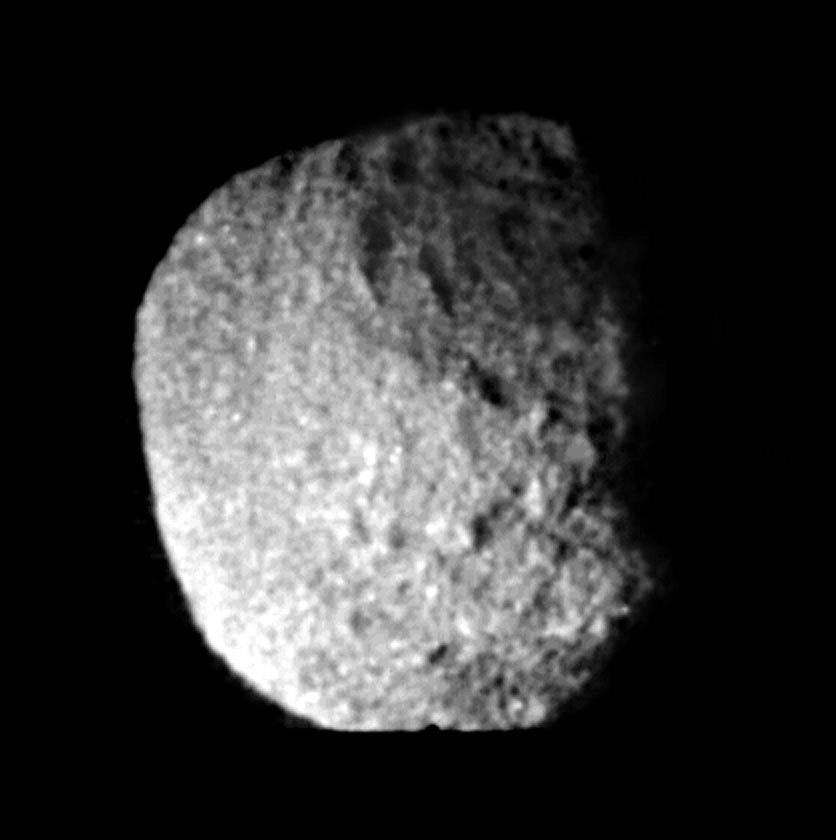
Voyager 2 image of Proteus

The fly-by of the Neptunian system provided the first accurate measurement of Neptune's mass, which was found to be 0.5 percent less than previously calculated. The new figure disproved the hypothesis that an undiscovered Planet X acted upon the orbits of Neptune and Uranus.

Neptune's magnetic field was found to be highly tilted and largely offset from the planet's center. The probe discovered auroras much weaker than those on Earth or other planets. The radio instruments on board found that Neptune's day lasts 16 hours and 6.7 minutes. Neptune's ring arcs had been observed from Earth many years prior to Voyager 2's visit, but the close inspection revealed that the ring system is fully circular and intact, and a total of four rings were counted.

Voyager 2 discovered six new small moons orbiting Neptune's equatorial plane, dubbed Naiad, Thalassa, Despina, Galatea, Larissa and Proteus. Two of Neptune's moons—Proteus and Triton—were photographed in detail; Nereid, the only other moon besides Triton known prior to the visit; was photographed only from great distance and not much information could be discerned from these photos. Proteus proved to be an ellipsoid, as large as gravity allows an ellipsoid body to become without rounding into a sphere, and appeared almost as dark as soot in color. Triton was revealed as having a remarkably active past, with active geysers, polar caps, and a very thin atmosphere characterized by clouds of what is thought to be nitrogen ice particles. At just 38 K (−235.2 °C), it is the coldest known planetary body in the Solar System. The closest approach to Triton, the last solid world Voyager 2 would explore close by, was about 40,000 km (25,000 mi).

A list of previous and upcoming missions to the outer Solar System can be found at the List of missions to the outer planets article.

== Possible future missions ==
As of November 2026, there are no approved future missions to visit the Neptunian system. NASA, ESA and independent academic groups have proposed and developed concept missions to visit Neptune.

After the Voyager flyby, NASA's next step in scientific exploration of the Neptune system was considered to be a flagship orbiter mission. Such a hypothetical mission was envisioned to be possible in the late 2020s or early 2030s. Another concept mission proposed for the 2040s is called the Neptune-Triton Explorer (NTE). NASA has researched several other project options for both flyby and orbiter missions (of similar design as the Cassini–Huygens mission to Saturn). These missions are often collectively called "RMA Neptune-Triton-KBO" missions, which also includes orbital missions that would not visit Kuiper belt objects (KBOs). Because of budgetary constraints, technological considerations, scientific priorities and other factors, none of these have been approved.

Several mission concepts have been developed to visit the Neptune system, including:

| Probe/Mission | Agency | Type | Description | Status | Notes |
|---|---|---|---|---|---|
| IHP-2 | CNSA | flyby | A pair of probes by CNSA designed to explore the heliosphere. The second would fly by Neptune in 2038 at a distance of 1,000 km and drop an atmospheric probe en route to the tail of the heliosphere. | planned | |
| Freya | ESA/NASA | orbiter | Main focus would be to map the gravitational fields in deep space, including the Outer Solar System (up to 50 AU) | proposed | |
| OSS | ESA/NASA | flyby | | proposed | |
| Triton Hopper | NASA | rocket-powered "hopper" | An NIAC study of a mission to Neptune with the goal of landing, and flying from site to site, on Neptune's moon Triton. | proposed | |
| Trident | NASA | flyby | A finalist in the Discovery program, would perform a single flyby of Neptune in 2038 and closely study its largest moon Triton. In June 2021, NASA declined to fund Trident, selecting instead DAVINCI and VERITAS as the 15th and 16th Discovery missions. | proposed | |
| Neptune Odyssey | NASA | orbiter/atmospheric probe | Mission concept for a Neptune orbiter and atmospheric probe being studied as a possible large strategic science mission (LSSM) by NASA that would launch in 2033 and arrive at Neptune in 2049. | proposed | |
| Triton Ocean Worlds Surveyor | NASA | orbiter | A downscaled version of Neptune Odyssey without the atmospheric probe. Launching in 2031 and arriving in 2047, it would be baselined for the lower-cost New Frontiers program rather than the LSSM class. | proposed | |
| Arcanum | | orbiter/lander | A Neptune-orbiting mission comprising Somerville (named for Mary Somerville) and a Triton lander Bingham (named for Hiram Bingham III), with an unusual added purpose to Somerville, acting as a space telescope at apoposeideum. A secondary intent is to prove the technology behind the newest super heavy-lift launch vehicles, primarily the SpaceX Starship. | proposed | |
| Argo | NASA | flyby | A cancelled mission concept in the New Frontiers program, a flyby mission to visit Jupiter, Saturn, Neptune (with Triton) and the Kuiper belt with launch in 2019. | cancelled | |
| New Horizons 2 | NASA | flyby | A cancelled mission concept for a flyby mission to the Neptune system and Kuiper belt based on the New Horizons space probe. | cancelled | |
| Nautilus | NASA | orbiter | A Triton-focused Neptune orbiter baselined for the New Frontiers program, with launch in August 2042 and orbital insertion slated for April 2057. | proposed | |
| Tianwen-5 | CNSA | orbiter | A long-term concept being developed, which could potentially arrive in 2058. | proposed | |

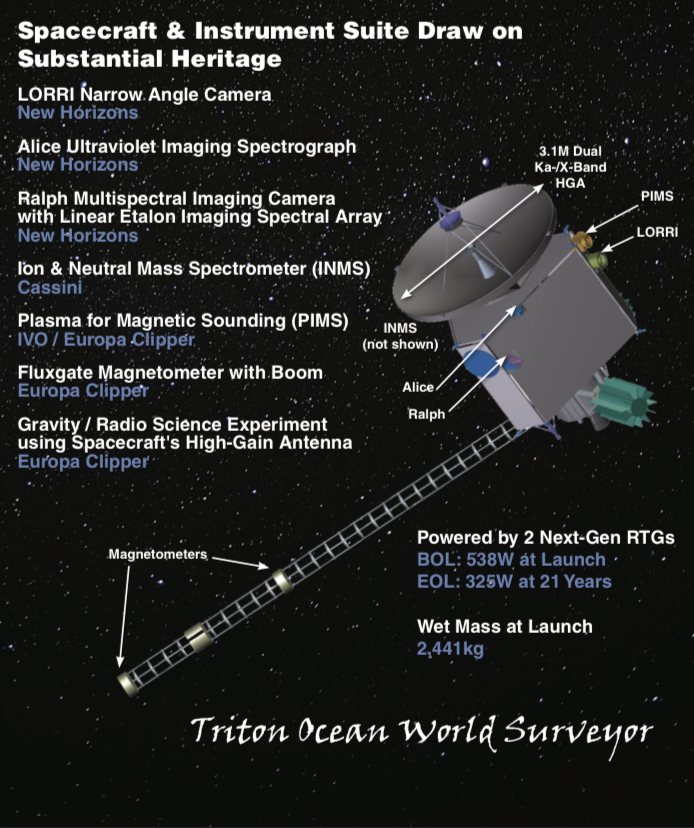
Triton Ocean World Surveyor

Nautilus

The lowest-energy trajectory for a launch from Earth to Neptune uses a Jupiter gravity assist, opening an optimal launch window with a 12-year interval, when Jupiter is in a favourable position relative to the Earth and Neptune. An optimal launch window was open for such a Neptune mission from 2014 to 2019, with the next opportunity occurring from 2031. These constraints are based on the requirement of a gravity assist from Jupiter. With the new Space Launch System (SLS) technology in development at Boeing, deep space missions with heavier payloads could potentially be propelled at much greater speeds (200 AU in 15 years) and missions to the outer planets could be launched independently of gravity assistance.

== Scientific studies from afar ==
Space telescopes such as the Hubble Space Telescope have signified a new era of detailed observations of faint objects from afar, across the entire electromagnetic spectrum. This includes faint objects in the Solar system, such as Neptune. Since 1997, adaptive optics technology has also allowed for detailed scientific observations of Neptune and its atmosphere from ground-based telescopes. These image recordings now exceed the capability of HST by far and in some instances even the Voyager images, such as those of Uranus. Ground-based observations are however always limited in their registration of electromagnetic waves of certain wavelengths, due to the inevitable atmospheric absorption, in particular of high energy waves.

== See also ==
- Exploration of Mercury
- Exploration of Venus
- Exploration of Mars
- Exploration of Jupiter
- Exploration of Saturn
- Exploration of Uranus

== Sources ==
- Neptune Voyager 2 – The Interstellar Mission, Jet Propulsion Laboratory, California Institute of Technology
- Neptune: In Depth Planets, NASA
