= ODINUS =

Proposed European twin orbiters to Neptune and Uranus

- Logo used in a mission proposal is a combination of the astronomical symbols for the planets Uranus and Neptune.
- Mission type: Orbiter
- Operator: European Space Agency
- Website: http://odinus.iaps.inaf.it/

Spacecraft properties
- Dry mass: 500-600 kg

Start of mission
- Launch date: 2034 (proposed)

Neptune orbiter
- Spacecraft component: Freyja

Uranus orbiter
- Spacecraft component: Freyr

ODINUS (Origins, Dynamics, and Interiors of the Neptunian and Uranian Systems) is a space mission concept proposed to the European Space Agency's Cosmic Vision programme. The ODINUS mission concept proposes to expand the Uranus orbiter and probe mission to two twin orbiters— dubbed Freyr and Freyja, the twin gods of the Norse pantheon. Their primary mission would be to study Neptune and Uranus with one orbiter each. If selected, ODINUS would launch in 2034.

== Instruments ==
The following six instruments are considered essential to the mission:

- Camera (Wide and Narrow Angle) – Designed to image the planet at the same level of detail as missions to the two gas giants have provided.
- VIS-NIR Image Spectrometer
- Magnetometer – To study the magnetic fields of Neptune.
- Mass Spectrometer (Ions and Neutrals, INMS)
- Doppler Spectro-Imager – To take seismic measurements.
- Microwave Radiometer

The following two additional instruments are strongly desired by the mission proposers:

- Energetic Neutral Atoms Detector – To complement the measurements of the INMS.
- High-sensitivity Accelerometer – To be used in the atmospheric descent phase.

== See also ==
- Exploration of Neptune
- Exploration of Uranus

Uranus mission proposals

- Uranus Orbiter and Probe
- MUSE
- OCEANUS
- Uranus Pathfinder
