= Atmosphere of Uranus =

Gas layer surrounding Uranus

A near infrared time lapse of the upper atmosphere of Uranus, taken by the James Webb Space Telescope. Blue represents the planet's lower atmosphere, while red represents higher altitudes.

The atmosphere of Uranus is composed primarily of hydrogen and helium. At depth, it is significantly enriched in volatiles (dubbed "ices") such as water, ammonia, and methane. The opposite is true for the upper atmosphere, which contains very few gases heavier than hydrogen and helium due to its low temperature. Uranus's atmosphere is the coldest of all the planets, with its temperature reaching as low as 49 K.

The Uranian atmosphere can be divided into three main layers: the troposphere, between altitudes (Note: Negative altitudes refer to locations below the nominal surface at 1 bar.) of −300 and 50 km and pressures from 100 to 0.1 bar; the stratosphere, spanning altitudes between 50 and 4000 km and pressures of between 0.1 and 10^{−10} bar; and the hot thermosphere (and exosphere) extending from an altitude of 4,000 km to several Uranian radii from the nominal surface at 1 bar pressure. Unlike Earth's, Uranus's atmosphere has no mesosphere.

The troposphere hosts four cloud layers: methane clouds at about 1.2 bar, hydrogen sulfide and ammonia clouds at 3–10 bar, ammonium hydrosulfide clouds at 20–40 bar, and finally water clouds below 50 bar. Only the upper two cloud layers have been observed directly—the deeper clouds remain speculative. Above the clouds lie several tenuous layers of photochemical haze. Discrete bright tropospheric clouds are rare on Uranus, probably due to sluggish convection in the planet's interior. Nevertheless, observations of such clouds were used to measure the planet's zonal winds, which are remarkably fast with speeds up to 240 m/s.

Little is known about the Uranian atmosphere. To date, only one spacecraft, Voyager 2, which passed by the planet in 1986, obtained some valuable compositional data. The Uranus Orbiter and Probe is scheduled to launch in 2031, arriving at Uranus in 2044. Its primary science objectives include a detailed study of Uranus's atmosphere.

== Observation and exploration ==
Uranus's atmosphere taken during the Outer Planet Atmosphere Legacy (OPAL) program.

Although there is no well-defined solid surface within Uranus's interior, the outermost part of Uranus's gaseous envelope (the region accessible to remote sensing) is called its atmosphere. Remote sensing capability extends down to roughly 300 km below the 1 bar level, with a corresponding pressure of around 100 bar and temperature of 320 K.

The observational history of the Uranian atmosphere is long and full of error and frustration. Uranus is a relatively faint object, and its visible angular diameter is smaller than 5″. The first spectra of Uranus were observed through a prism in 1869 and 1871 by Angelo Secchi and William Huggins, who found a number of broad dark bands, which they were unable to identify. They also failed to detect any solar Fraunhofer lines—the fact later interpreted by Norman Lockyer as indicating that Uranus emitted its own light as opposed to reflecting light from the Sun. In 1889 however, astronomers observed solar Fraunhofer lines in photographic ultraviolet spectra of the planet, proving once and for all that Uranus was shining by reflected light. The nature of the broad dark bands in its visible spectrum remained unknown until the fourth decade of the twentieth century.

Although Uranus is presently largely blank in appearance, it has been historically shown to have occasional features, such as in March and April 1884, when astronomers Henri Joseph Perrotin, Norman Lockyer, and Charles Trépied observed a bright, elongated spot (presumably a storm) circling the equator of the planet.

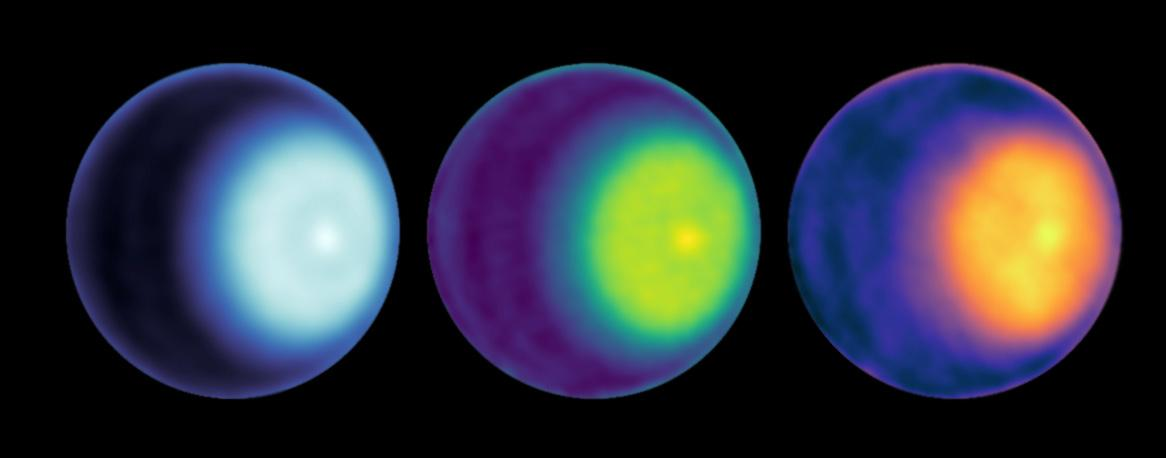
Planet Uranus - North Pole - Cyclone (VLA; October 2021)

The key to deciphering Uranus's spectrum was found in the 1930s by Rupert Wildt and Vesto Slipher, who found that the dark bands at 543, 619, 925, 865 and 890 nm belonged to gaseous methane. They had never been observed before because they were very weak and required a long path length to be detected. This meant that the atmosphere of Uranus was transparent to a much greater depth compared to those of other giant planets. In 1950, Gerard Kuiper noticed another diffuse dark band in the spectrum of Uranus at 827 nm, which he failed to identify. In 1952 Gerhard Herzberg, a future Nobel Prize winner, showed that this band was caused by the weak quadrupole absorption of molecular hydrogen, which thus became the second compound detected on Uranus. Until 1986 only two gases, methane and hydrogen, were known in the Uranian atmosphere. The far-infrared spectroscopic observation beginning from 1967 consistently showed the atmosphere of Uranus was in approximate thermal balance with incoming solar radiation (in other words, it radiated as much heat as it received from the Sun), and no internal heat source was required to explain observed temperatures. No discrete features had been observed on Uranus prior to the Voyager 2 visit in 1986.

In January 1986, the Voyager 2 spacecraft flew by Uranus at a minimal distance of 107,100 km providing the first close-up images and spectra of its atmosphere. They generally confirmed that the atmosphere was made of mainly hydrogen and helium with around 2% methane. The atmosphere appeared highly transparent and lacking thick stratospheric and tropospheric hazes. Only a limited number of discrete clouds were observed.

In the 1990s and 2000s, observations by the Hubble Space Telescope and by ground-based telescopes equipped with adaptive optics systems (the Keck telescope and NASA Infrared Telescope Facility, for instance) made it possible for the first time to observe discrete cloud features from Earth. Tracking them has allowed astronomers to re-measure wind speeds on Uranus, known before only from the Voyager 2 observations, and to study the dynamics of the Uranian atmosphere.

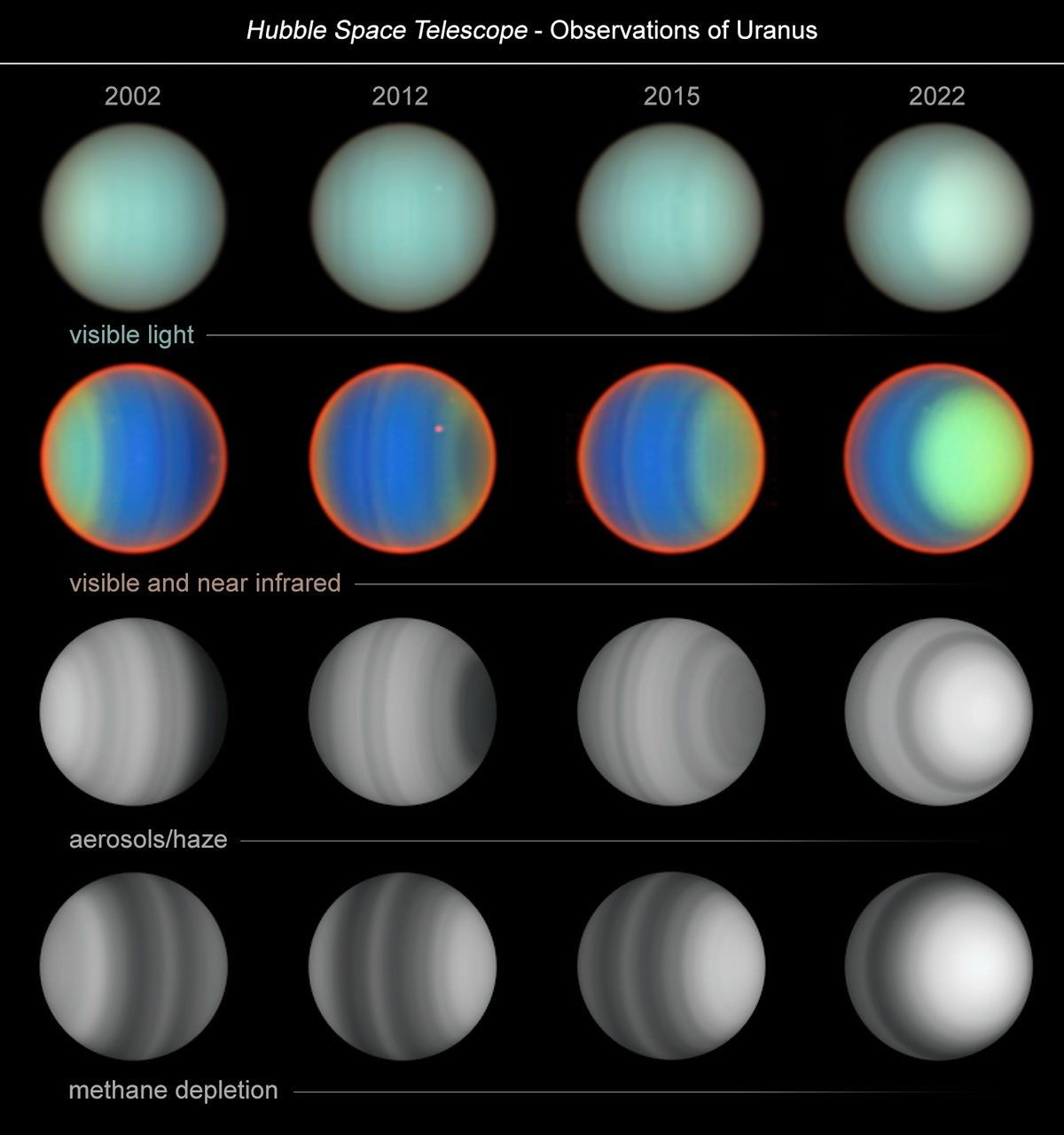
Uranus's atmosphere in two decades imaged by the Hubble Space Telescope. In near-infrared, red shades indicate low methane concentration, green indicates medium methane concentration and blue indicates higher methane concentration. In the third row, bright shades indicate cloudy areas, while the dark areas represent clearer conditions. In the fourth row, bright areas indicate methane depletion, while dark areas show very high amounts of methane.

In March 2025, NASA's research team published their findings on Hubble's two-decade long observation of Uranus from 2002 to 2022 (two decades on Earth is roughly equivalent to one season on Uranus which lasts 21 Earth years) as Uranus's south pole began moving towards darkness and its north pole began to point towards the Sun. This is the first time that astronomers were able to properly distinguish aerosol and methane concentration on Uranus when Hubble's Space Telescope Imaging Spectrograph (STIS) were pointed at Uranus for the first time in 2002.

The study showed that the limb of the stratosphere of Uranus is almost completely devoid of methane. At middle and low latitudes, aerosols levels and methane depletion have their own latitudinal structure and they mostly did not change much over the course of two decades. However, in the polar regions, aerosols and methane depletion behave very differently.

Aerosol levels near the north pole display a dramatic increase, showing up as very dark during early northern spring equinox and aersonal concentration became very high in recent years. Aerosols also seem to disappear at the left limb as the solar radiation level plummeted due to the changing orientation of the planet's axis. This is long-period evidence that solar radiation can change aerosol and haze level in the atmosphere of Uranus. On the other hand, methane depletion remained high in both polar regions throughout the observation period.

== Composition ==
The composition of the Uranian atmosphere is different from that of Uranus as a whole, consisting mainly of molecular hydrogen and helium. The helium molar fraction, i.e. the number of helium atoms per molecule of hydrogen/helium, was determined from the analysis of Voyager 2 far infrared and radio occultation observations. The currently accepted value is 0.152±0.033 in the upper troposphere, which corresponds to a mass fraction 0.262±0.048. This value is very close to the protosolar helium mass fraction of 0.2741±0.0120, indicating that helium has not settled towards the centre of the planet as it has in the gas giants.

The third most abundant constituent of the Uranian atmosphere is methane (CH_{4}), the presence of which has been known for some time as a result of the ground-based spectroscopic observations. Methane possesses prominent absorption bands in the visible and near-infrared, making Uranus aquamarine or cyan in color. Below the methane cloud deck at 1.3 bar methane molecules account for about 2.3% of the atmosphere by molar fraction; about 10 to 30 times that found in the Sun. The mixing ratio is much lower in the upper atmosphere due to the extremely low temperature at the tropopause, which lowers the saturation level and causes excess methane to freeze out. Methane appears to be undersaturated in the upper troposphere above the clouds having a partial pressure of only 30% of the saturated vapor pressure there. The concentration of less volatile compounds such as ammonia, water and hydrogen sulfide in the deep atmosphere is poorly known. However, as with methane, their abundances are probably greater than solar values by a factor of at least 20 to 30, and possibly by a factor of a few hundred.

Knowledge of the isotopic composition of Uranus's atmosphere is very limited. To date the only known isotope abundance ratio is that of deuterium to light hydrogen: 5.5+3.5
−1.5×10^{−5}, which was measured by the Infrared Space Observatory (ISO) in the 1990s. It appears to be higher than the protosolar value of (2.25±0.35)×10^{−5} measured in Jupiter. The deuterium is found almost exclusively in hydrogen deuteride molecules which it forms with normal hydrogen atoms.

Infrared spectroscopy, including measurements with Spitzer Space Telescope (SST), and UV occultation observations, found trace amounts of complex hydrocarbons in the stratosphere of Uranus, which are thought to be produced from methane by photolysis induced by solar UV radiation. They include ethane (C_{2}H_{6}), acetylene (C_{2}H_{2}), methylacetylene (CH_{3}C_{2}H), diacetylene (C_{2}HC_{2}H). Infrared spectroscopy also uncovered traces of water vapour, carbon monoxide and carbon dioxide in the stratosphere, which are likely to originate from an external source such as infalling dust and comets.

== Structure ==
Temperature profile of the Uranian troposphere and lower stratosphere. Cloud and haze layers are also indicated.

The Uranian atmosphere can be divided into three main layers: the troposphere, between altitudes of −300 and 50 km and pressures from 100 to 0.1 bar; the stratosphere, spanning altitudes between 50 and 4000 km and pressures between 0.1 and 10^{−10} bar; and the thermosphere/exosphere extending from 4000 km to as high as a few Uranus radii from the surface. There is no mesosphere.

=== Troposphere ===
The troposphere is the lowest and densest part of the atmosphere and is characterised by a decrease in temperature with altitude. The temperature falls from about 320 K at the base of the troposphere at −300 km to about 53 K at 50 km. The temperature at the cold upper boundary of the troposphere (the tropopause) actually varies in the range between 49 and 57 K depending on planetary latitude, with the lowest temperature reached near 25° southern latitude. The troposphere holds almost all of the mass of the atmosphere, and the tropopause region is also responsible for the vast majority of the planet's thermal far infrared emissions, thus determining its effective temperature of 59.1±0.3 K.

The troposphere is believed to possess a highly complex cloud structure; water clouds are hypothesised to lie in the pressure range of 50 to 300 bar, ammonium hydrosulfide clouds in the range of 20 and 40 bar, ammonia or hydrogen sulfide clouds at between 3 and 10 bar and finally thin methane clouds at 1 to 2 bar. Although Voyager 2 directly detected methane clouds, all other cloud layers remain speculative. The existence of a hydrogen sulfide cloud layer is only possible if the ratio of sulfur and nitrogen abundances (S/N ratio) is significantly greater than its solar value of 0.16. Otherwise all hydrogen sulfide would react with ammonia, producing ammonium hydrosulfide, and the ammonia clouds would appear instead in the pressure range 3–10 bar. The elevated S/N ratio implies depletion of ammonia in the pressure range 20–40 bar, where the ammonium hydrosulfide clouds form. These can result from the dissolution of ammonia in water droplets within water clouds or in the deep water-ammonia ionic ocean.

The exact location of the upper two cloud layers is somewhat controversial. Methane clouds were directly detected by Voyager 2 at 1.2–1.3 bar by radio occultation. This result was later confirmed by an analysis of the Voyager 2 limb images. The top of the deeper ammonia/hydrogen sulfide clouds were determined to be at 3 bar based on the spectroscopic data in the visible and near-infra spectral ranges (0.5–1 μm). However a recent analysis of the spectroscopic data in the wavelength range 1–2.3 μm placed the methane cloudtops at 2 bar, and the top of the lower clouds at 6 bar. This contradiction may be resolved when new data on methane absorption in Uranus's atmosphere are available. (Note: Indeed, a recent analysis based on a new data set of the methane absorption coefficients shifted the clouds to 1.6 and 3 bar, respectively.) The optical depth of the two upper cloud layers varies with latitude: both become thinner at the poles as compared to the equator, though in 2007 the methane cloud layer's optical depth had a local maximum at 45°S, where the southern polar collar is located (see below).

The troposphere is very dynamic, exhibiting strong zonal winds, bright methane clouds, dark spots and noticeable seasonal changes (see below).

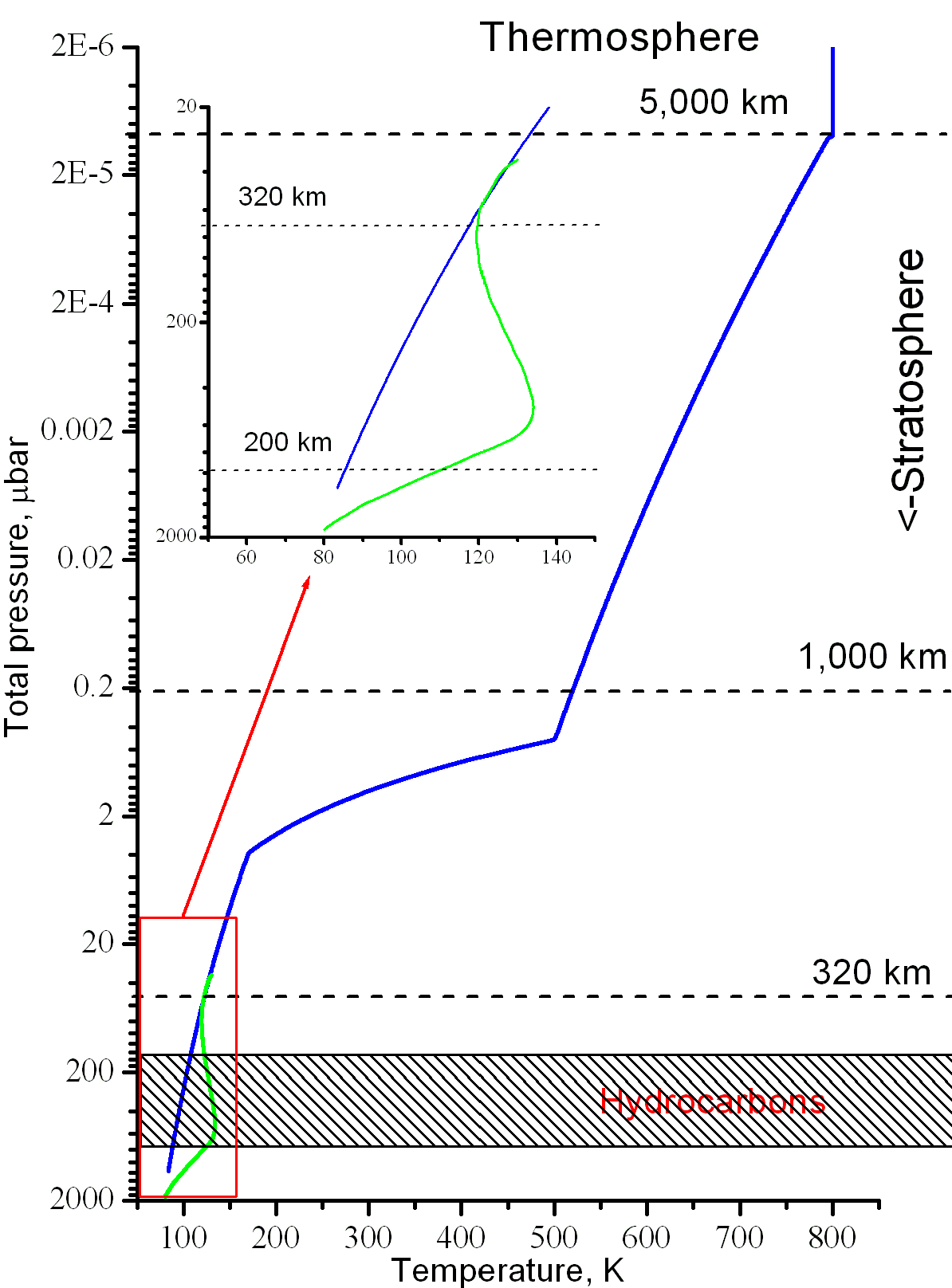
Temperature profiles in the stratosphere and thermosphere of Uranus. The shaded area is where hydrocarbons are concentrated.

=== Stratosphere ===
The stratosphere is the middle layer of the Uranian atmosphere, in which temperature generally increases with altitude from 53 K in the tropopause to between 800 and 850 K at the base thermosphere. The heating of the stratosphere is caused by the downward heat conduction from the hot thermosphere as well as by absorption of solar UV and IR radiation by methane and the complex hydrocarbons formed as a result of methane photolysis. The methane enters the stratosphere through the cold tropopause, where its mixing ratio relative to molecular hydrogen is about 3 × 10^{–5}, three times below saturation. It decreases further to about 10^{−7} at the altitude corresponding to pressure of 0.1 mbar.

Hydrocarbons heavier than methane are present in a relatively narrow layer between 160 and 320 km in altitude, corresponding to the pressure range from 10 to 0.1 mbar and temperatures from 100 to 130 K. The most abundant stratospheric hydrocarbons after methane are acetylene and ethane, with mixing ratios of around 10^{−7}. Heavier hydrocarbons like methylacetylene and diacetylene have mixing ratios of about 10^{−10}—three orders of magnitude lower. The temperature and hydrocarbon mixing ratios in the stratosphere vary with time and latitude. (Note: In 1986 the stratosphere was poorer in hydrocarbons at the poles than near the equator; at the poles the hydrocarbons were also confined to much lower altitudes. Temperatures in the stratosphere may increase at the solstices and decrease at equinoxes by as much as 50 K.) Complex hydrocarbons are responsible for the cooling of the stratosphere, especially acetylene, having a strong emission line at the wavelength of 13.7 μm.

In addition to hydrocarbons, the stratosphere contains carbon monoxide, as well as traces of water vapor and carbon dioxide. The mixing ratio of carbon monoxide—3 × 10^{−8}—is very similar to that of the hydrocarbons, while the mixing ratios of carbon dioxide and water are about 10^{−11} and 8×10^{−9}, respectively. These three compounds are distributed relatively homogeneously in the stratosphere and are not confined to a narrow layer like hydrocarbons.

Ethane, acetylene and diacetylene condense in the colder lower part of stratosphere forming haze layers with an optical depth of about 0.01 in visible light. Condensation occurs at approximately 14, 2.5 and 0.1 mbar for ethane, acetylene and diacetylene, respectively. (Note: At these altitudes the temperature has local maxima, which may be caused by absorption of solar radiation by haze particles.) The concentration of hydrocarbons in the Uranian stratosphere is significantly lower than in the stratospheres of the other giant planets—the upper atmosphere of Uranus is very clean and transparent above the haze layers. This depletion is caused by weak vertical mixing, and makes Uranus's stratosphere less opaque and, as a result, colder than those of other giant planets. The hazes, like their parent hydrocarbons, are distributed unevenly across Uranus; at the solstice of 1986, when Voyager 2 passed by the planet, they were concentrated near the sunlit pole, making it dark in ultraviolet light.

=== Thermosphere and ionosphere ===
The outermost layer of the Uranian atmosphere, extending for thousands of kilometres, is the thermosphere/exosphere, which has a uniform temperature of around 800 to 850 K. This is much higher than, for instance, the 420 K observed in the thermosphere of Saturn. The heat sources necessary to sustain such high temperatures are not understood, since neither solar FUV/EUV radiation nor auroral activity can provide the necessary energy. The weak cooling efficiency due to the depletion of hydrocarbons in the stratosphere may contribute to this phenomenon. In addition to molecular hydrogen, the thermosphere contains a large proportion of free hydrogen atoms, while helium is thought to be absent here, because it separates diffusively at lower altitudes.

The thermosphere and upper part of the stratosphere contain a large concentration of ions and electrons, forming the ionosphere of Uranus. Radio occultation observations by the Voyager 2 spacecraft showed that the ionosphere lies between 1,000 and 10,000 km altitude and may include several narrow and dense layers between 1,000 and 3,500 km. The electron density in the Uranian ionosphere is on average 10^{4} cm^{−3}, reaching to as high as 10^{5} cm^{−3} in the narrow layers in the stratosphere. The ionosphere is mainly sustained by solar UV radiation and its density depends on the solar activity. The auroral activity on Uranus is not as powerful as at Jupiter and Saturn and contributes little to the ionization. (Note: The total power input into the aurora is 3–7 × 10^{10} W—insufficient to heat up the thermosphere.) The high electron density may be in part caused by the low concentration of hydrocarbons in the stratosphere.

One of the sources of information about the ionosphere and thermosphere comes from ground-based measurements of the intense mid-infrared (3–4 μm) emissions of the trihydrogen cation (H_{3}^{+}). The total emitted power is 1–2 × 10^{11} W—an order of magnitude higher than that the near-infrared hydrogen quadrupole emissions. (Note: The hot thermosphere of Uranus produces hydrogen quadrupole emission lines in the near-infrared part of the spectrum (1.8–2.5 μm) with the total emitted power of 1–2 × 10^{10} W. The power emitted by molecular hydrogen in the far infrared part of the spectrum is about 2 × 10^{11} W.) Trihydrogen cation functions as one of main coolers of the ionosphere.

The upper atmosphere of Uranus is the source of the far ultraviolet (90–140 nm) emissions known as dayglow or electroglow, which, like the H_{3}^{+} IR radiation, emanates exclusively from the sunlit part of the planet. This phenomenon, which occurs in the thermospheres of all giant planets and was mysterious for a time after its discovery, is interpreted as a UV fluorescence of atomic and molecular hydrogen excited by solar radiation or by photoelectrons.

==== Hydrogen corona ====
The upper part of the thermosphere, where the mean free path of the molecules exceeds the scale height, (Note: The scale height sh is defined as sh = RT/(Mg_{j}), where R = 8.31 J/mol/K is the gas constant, M ≈ 0.0023 kg/mol is the average molar mass in the Uranian atmosphere, T is temperature and g_{j} ≈ 8.9 m/s^{2} is the gravitational acceleration at the surface of Uranus. As the temperature varies from 53 K in the tropopause up to 800 K in the thermosphere, the scale height changes from 20 to 400 km.) is called the exosphere. The lower boundary of the Uranian exosphere, the exobase, is located at a height of about 6,500 km, or 1/4 of the planetary radius, above the surface. The exosphere is unusually extended, reaching as far as several Uranian radii from the planet. It is made mainly of hydrogen atoms and is often called the hydrogen corona of Uranus. The high temperature and relatively high pressure at the base of the thermosphere explain in part why Uranus's exosphere is so vast. (Note: The corona contains a significant population of supra-thermal (energy of up to 2 eV) hydrogen atoms. Their origin is unclear, but they may be produced by the same mechanism that heats the thermosphere.) The number density of atomic hydrogen in the corona falls slowly with the distance from the planet, remaining as high a few hundred atoms per cm^{3} at a few radii from Uranus. The effects of this bloated exosphere include a drag on small particles orbiting Uranus, causing a general depletion of dust in the Uranian rings. The infalling dust in turn contaminates the upper atmosphere of the planet.

== Dynamics ==
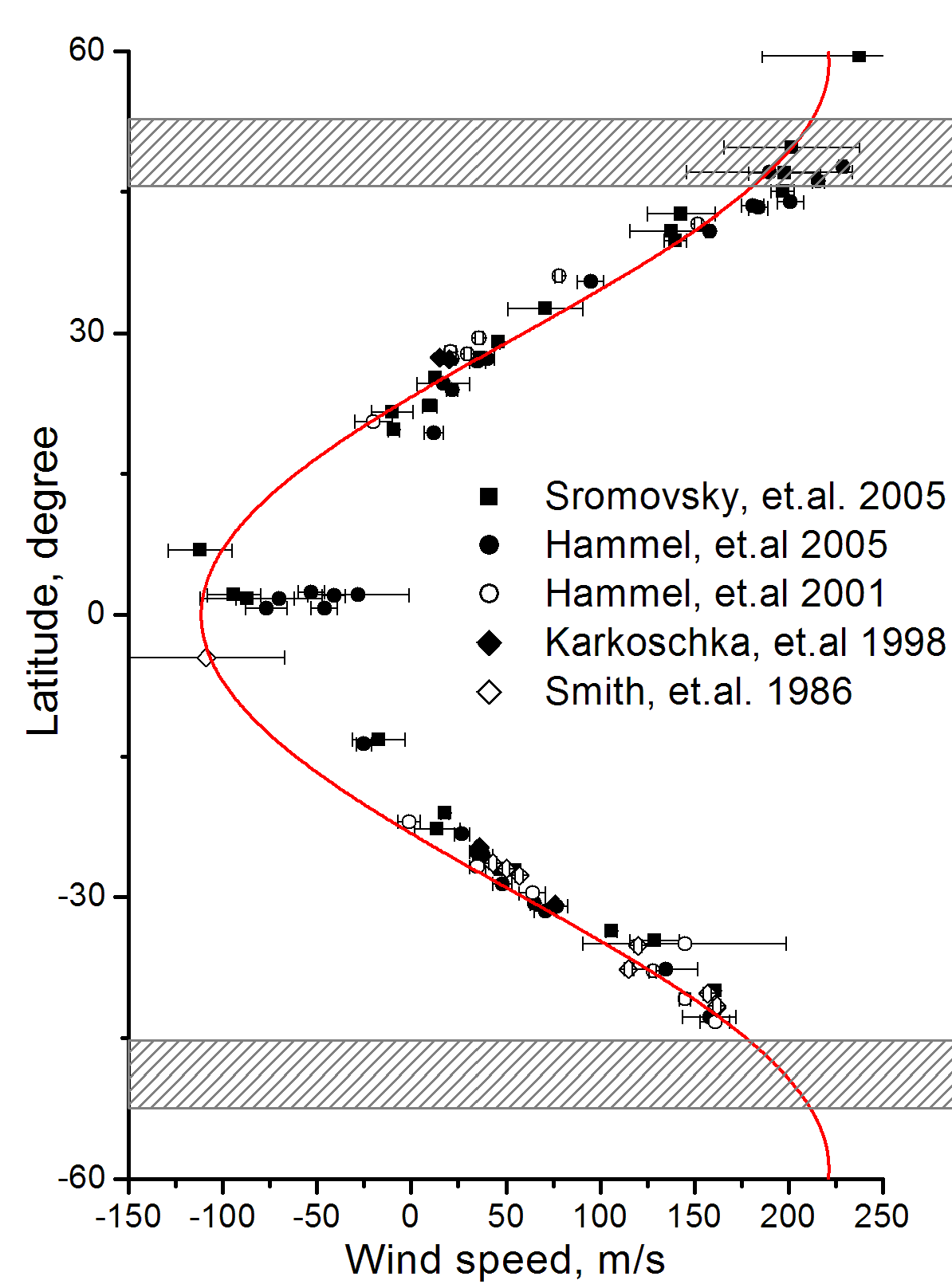
Zonal wind speeds on Uranus. Shaded areas show the southern collar and its future northern counterpart. The red curve is a symmetrical fit to the data.

Uranus has a relatively bland appearance, lacking broad colorful bands and large clouds prevalent on Jupiter and Saturn. Discrete features were only once observed in Uranus's atmosphere before 1986. The most conspicuous features on Uranus observed by Voyager 2 were the dark low latitude region between −40° and −20° and bright southern polar cap. The northern boundary of the cap was located at about −45° of latitude. The brightest zonal band was located near the edge of the cap at −50° to −45° and was then called a polar collar. The southern polar cap, which existed at the time of the solstice in 1986, faded away in 1990s. After the equinox in 2007, the southern polar collar started to fade away as well, while the northern polar collar located at 45° to 50° latitude (first appeared in 2007) have grown more conspicuous since then.

The atmosphere of Uranus is calm compared to those of other giant planets. Only a limited number of small bright clouds at middle latitudes in both hemispheres and one Uranus Dark Spot have been observed since 1986. One of those bright cloud features, located at −34° of latitude and called Berg, probably existed continuously since at least 1986. Nevertheless, the Uranian atmosphere has rather strong zonal winds blowing in the retrograde (counter to the rotation) direction near the equator, but switching to the prograde direction poleward of ±20° latitude. The wind speeds are from −50 to −100 m/s at the equator increasing up to 240 m/s near 50° latitude. The wind profile measured before the equinox of 2007 was slightly asymmetric with winds stronger in the southern hemisphere, although it turned out to be a seasonal effect as this hemisphere was continuously illuminated by the Sun before 2007. After 2007 winds in the northern hemisphere accelerated while those in the southern one slowed down.

Uranus exhibits a considerable seasonal variation over its 84-year orbit. It is generally brighter near solstices and dimmer at equinoxes. The variations are largely caused by changes in the viewing geometry: a bright polar region comes into view near solstices, while the dark equator is visible near equinoxes. Still there exist some intrinsic variations of the reflectivity of the atmosphere: periodically fading and brightening polar caps as well as appearing and disappearing polar collars.

== See also ==
- Magnetosphere of Uranus
