= Small Dark Spot =

Southern cyclonic storm on the planet Neptune

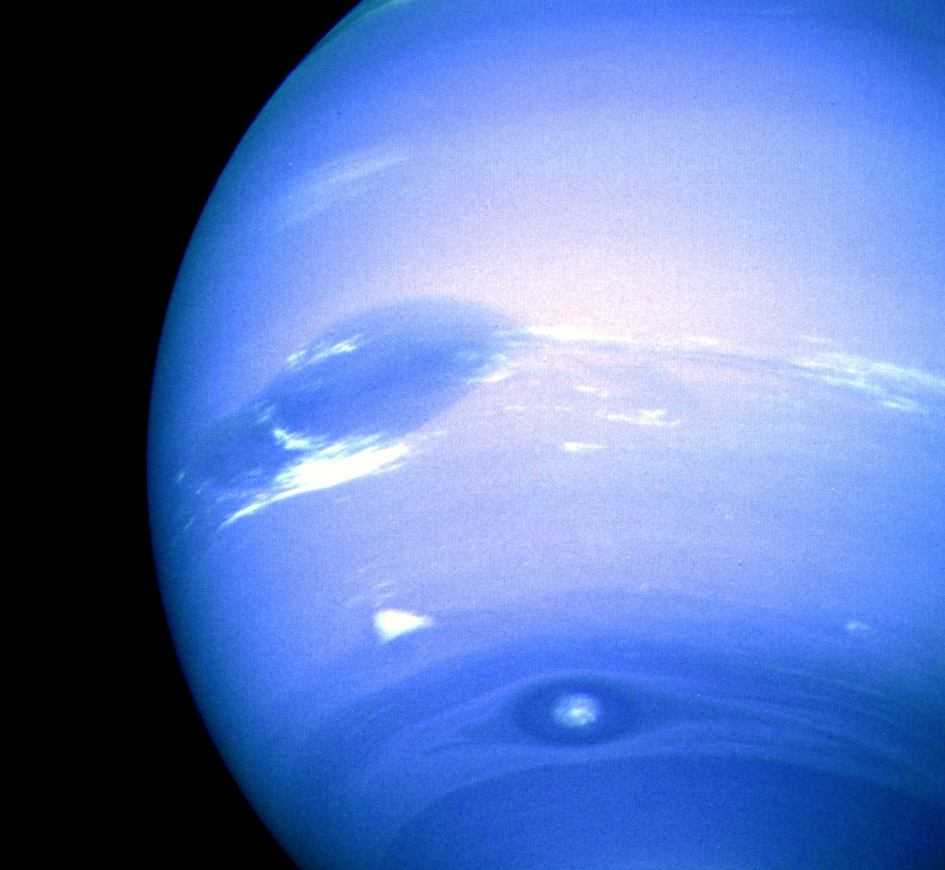
The Great Dark Spot (top), Scooter (middle white cloud), and Small Dark Spot (bottom) as seen by the Voyager 2 spacecraft in August 1989

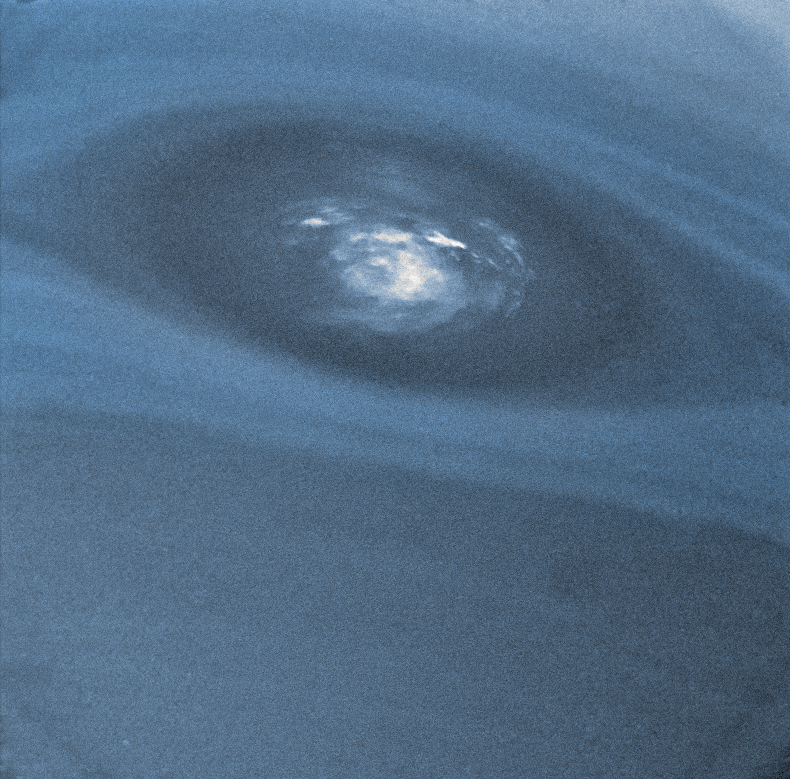
An enhanced-color view of the Small Dark Spot

The Small Dark Spot, sometimes also called Dark Spot 2 or The Wizard's Eye, was an extraterrestrial vortex on the planet Neptune. It was the second largest southern cyclonic storm on the planet in 1989, when Voyager 2 flew by the planet. When the Hubble Space Telescope observed Neptune in 1994, the storm had disappeared.

== Observation history ==
The Small Dark Spot was discovered in 1989 by the Voyager 2 spacecraft along with the Great Dark Spot and Scooter (a bright fast moving cloud located between the two giant storms). The Small Dark Spot was found at a latitude of 54° South while rotating East around Neptune with a period of 16.1 hours. Unlike the Great Dark Spot (which has some of the highest measured wind speeds in the Solar System), wind speed data was not taken for the Small Dark Spot. The spot was also observed without any white "companion clouds" present around its edges, again in contrast to the Great Dark Spot. When NASA pointed the Hubble Space Telescope toward Neptune in 1994, both giant spots were no longer present.

== Physical characteristics ==
The nickname "Wizard's Eye" given to this storm comes from its distinct features which create a striking eye-like appearance. Overall the Small Dark Spot is significantly smaller but on the same order of magnitude as the Great Dark Spot and rotates about 30° further south and with a period about 2 hours shorter than the larger storm.

The dark oval of this storm which created the overall outline for the eye-like shape was formed by a clockwise rotating vortex which sucked atmosphere inward toward the planet center. This action of pulling atmosphere downward created a hole in the upper methane cloud deck of Neptune and gave the storm its darker blue tone. Also present within the dark region of the storm were sharp band-lines potentially indicating unseen high winds, despite exact measurements having never been taken.

The bright central region representing the pupil of the eye-like shape was formed by white methane-ice clouds upwelling from the center of the storm. Within the chaos of these central clouds are some larger structures, including a distinct V-shape on the East side of the storm indicating the storm's believed clockwise rotation. These clouds are composed of the same methane-ice that forms similar clouds called "companion clouds" present near the edges of other large storms on the planet; however, the Small Dark Spot did not have any of these companion clouds apparent in its 1989 observation. Additionally, no companion clouds were observed in the region of the spot in the 1994 observation of the planet.

== Disappearance ==
After being observed by Voyager 2 in 1989, the planet would not be observed in high resolution again until the Hubble Space Telescope turned its view to it in 1994. In 1994 and subsequent observations, both major storms had apparently vanished. The storm causing the Great Dark Spot, however, may have continued at a lower altitude as evidenced by the persistence of the storm's companion clouds. The Small Dark Spot did not have any companion clouds by which to judge survival of the storm causing the spot. While a conjectured mechanism for decay and death of large vortexes on Neptune is their approach to the equator where the planet has 400 meter per second jet streams, this storm (as well as others) could have also decayed from unexplained mechanisms of Neptune's atmosphere.

== See also ==
- Dragon Storm (astronomy)
- Extraterrestrial cyclone
- Great Dark Spot
- Oval BA
- Great Red Spot
- Great White Spot
