= Dragon Storm (astronomy) =

Thunderstorm on Saturn

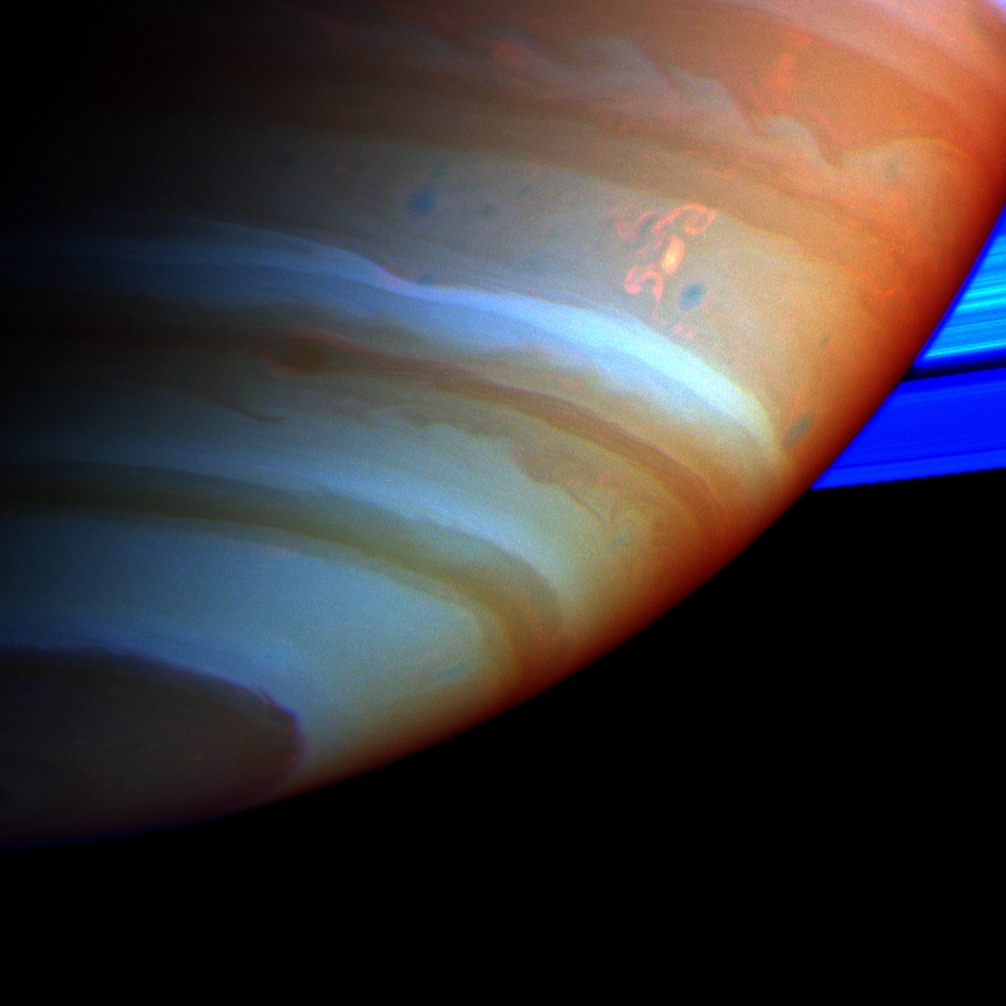
A false-color composite of the Dragon Storm as imaged by the Cassini spacecraft in September 2004. The bright orange feature near the center in the top-right of the image is the Dragon Storm.

The Dragon Storm is a giant thunderstorm located in Saturn's southern hemisphere, which is labeled as the "storm alley" region. The storm could have a range of 2,000 miles (3,200 km) or more, and can be compared to the electric thunderstorms of Earth. It acquires its energy in the deep layers of Saturn's atmosphere and produces radio waves that reflect during its burst of short static which helped Cassini detect it.

The Dragon Storm (named in September 2004 for its unusual shape) is a large, bright and complex convective storm in Saturn's southern hemisphere. It appears to be long-lived and periodically flares up to produce dramatic white cloudy plumes that then subside. This is similar to the extreme conditions on Jupiter at the site of its Great Red Spot, an anticyclonic storm that has been continually observed since 1830. The Dragon Storm is a strong source of radio emissions, which are interpreted by Cassini scientists as electric events similar to lightning on Earth.

Cassini detected a burst of radio emissions when the Dragon Storm started rising over the horizon during the nighttime of the planet. The burst came to a stop when it hit the sunlight. During the nighttime of Saturn, the storm starts; as soon as it hits sunlight, it completely stops. This pattern repeats, seeming to go on and off for a few weeks as Saturn rotates.

== See also ==
- Extraterrestrial cyclone
- Great Dark Spot
- Great White Spot
- Oval BA
- Saturn Electrostatic Discharges
- Small Dark Spot
