= Great White Spot =

Periodic storms on Saturn

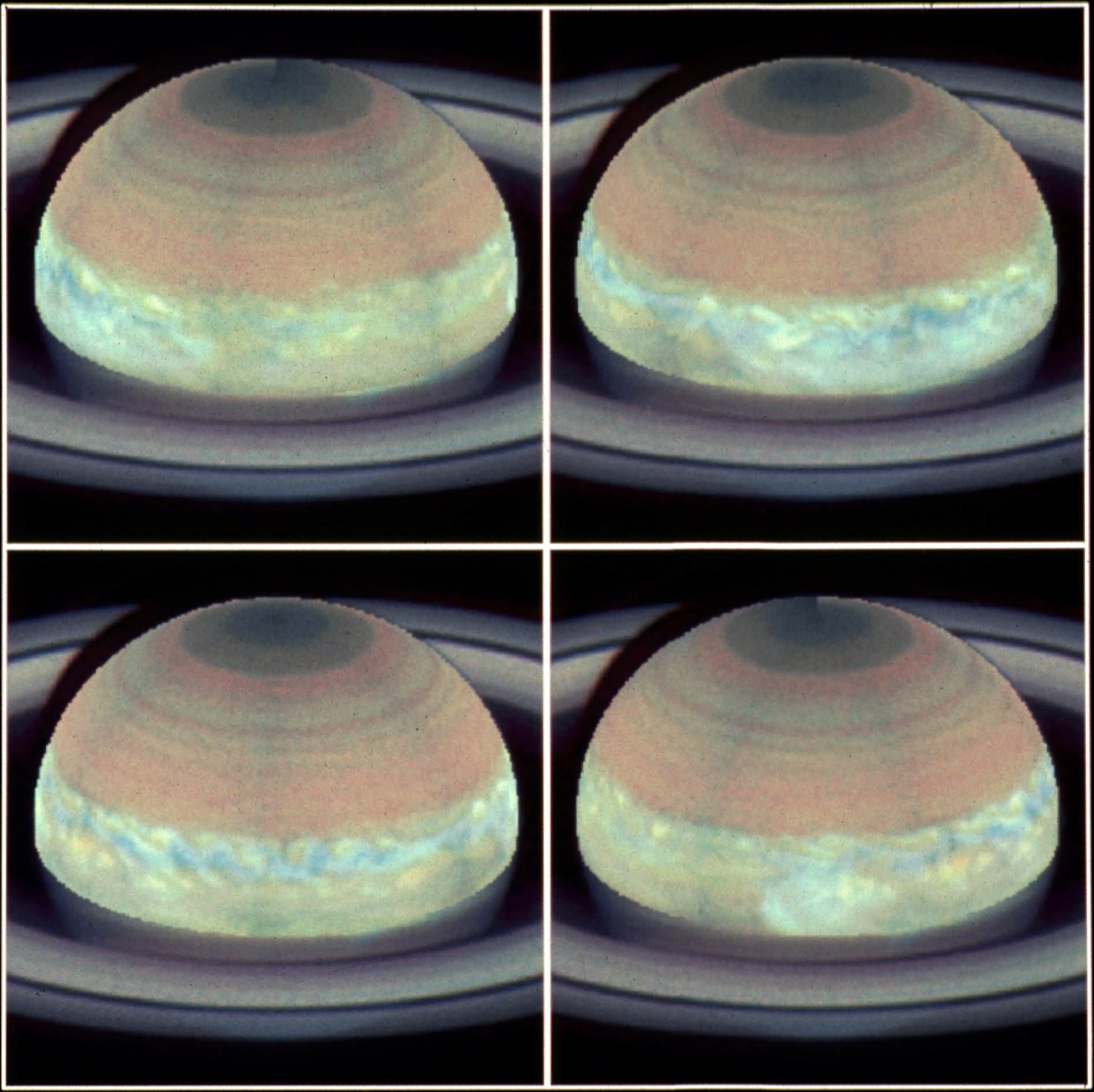
Hubble observation of the 1990 GWS

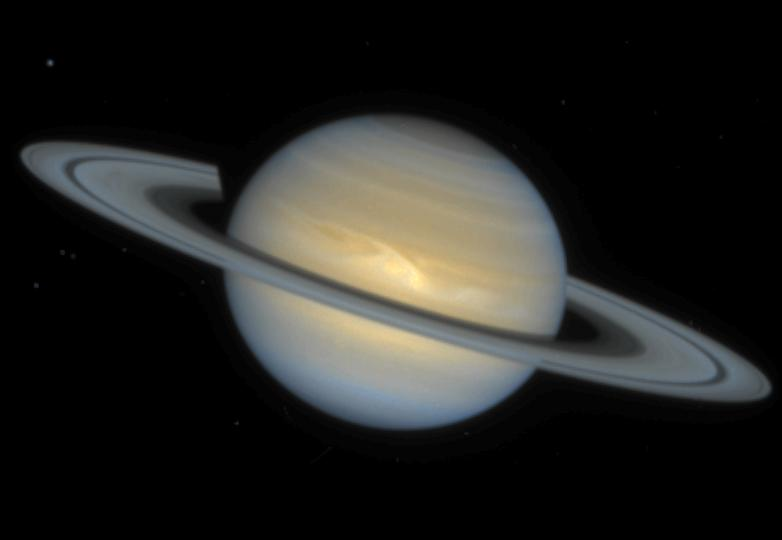
The 1994 Storm seen by Hubble

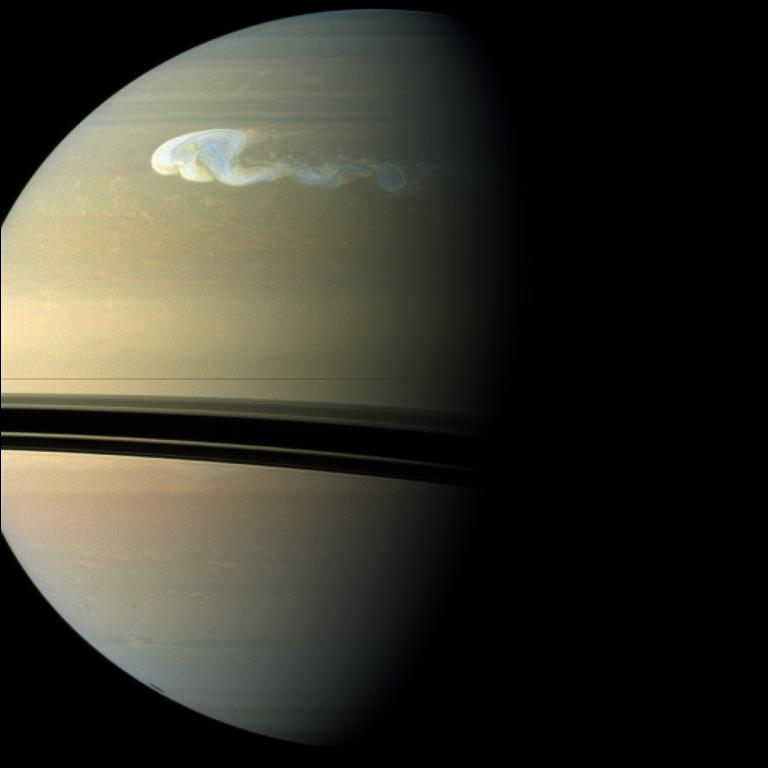
The 2010/2011 GWS in December 2010 seen by Cassini

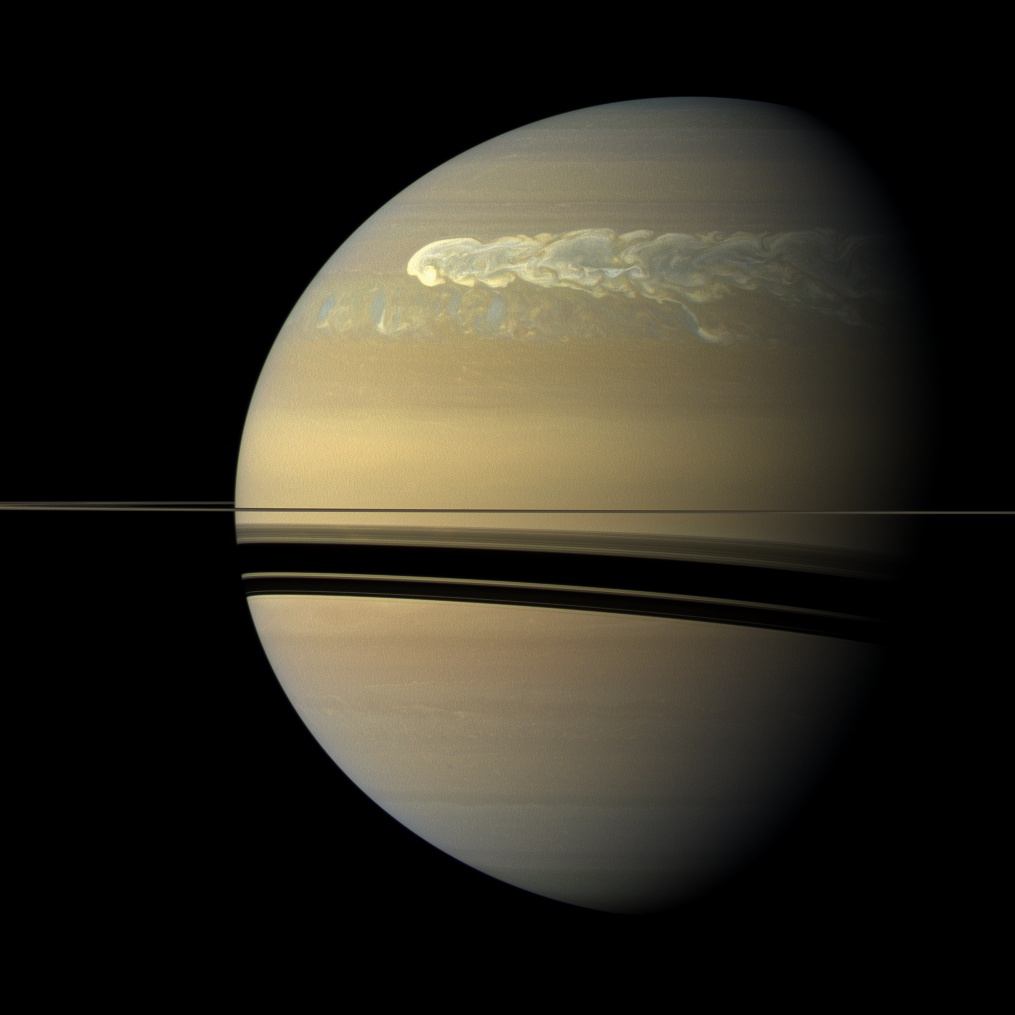
The GWS in 2011 seen by Cassini

The Great White Spot, also known as Great White Oval (named by analogy to Jupiter's Great Red Spot) is a series of periodic storms on the planet Saturn that are large enough to be visible from Earth by telescope by their characteristic white appearance. The spots can be several thousands of kilometers wide.

The Cassini orbiter was able to track the 2010–11 instance of the storm, also known as the Northern Electrostatic Disturbance, because of an increase in radio and plasma interference, or the Great Springtime Storm.

Cassini data has revealed a loss of acetylene in the white clouds, an increase of phosphine, and an unusual temperature drop in the center of the storm. After the visible aspects of the storm subsided, in 2012, a "belch" of heat and ethylene was emitted from two hotspots that merged.

== Occurrence ==
The phenomenon is somewhat periodic at 28.5-year intervals, when Saturn's northern hemisphere tilts most toward the Sun. Usually this is during the solar longitude of around 90-180°, only the 2010 GWS was ahead of its time shortly after equinox. The following is a list of recorded sightings. Six events are recognized as Great White Spots.

Equatorial (1.8°N to 9.8°N)

- 1876 – Observed by Asaph Hall. He used the white spots to determine the planet's period of rotation.
- 1933 – Observed by Will Hay, comic actor and amateur astronomer. Until recent times the most celebrated observation.
- 1990 – Observed by Stuart Wilber, from 24 September through November

Mid-latitudes

- 1903 – Observed by Edward Barnard at 36.7°N.
- 2010 – First observed by Anthony Wesley, photographed by Cassini space probe 2010–11. Located at 32.4°N.

Polar

- 1960 – Observed by JH Botham (South Africa). Located at 52.5°N and expanded until it reached the hexagon.

Mid-sized synoptic-scale storms are sometimes related to the GWS, such as the 1994 storm studied by ground-based observers and the Hubble Space Telescope. This storm was located at 9.4°N and is probably related to the 1990 GWS. Pre 2010 GWS storms in the "storm alley" occurred in mid-latitudes in the southern hemisphere (2002–2010 at 36.2°S; 1.5° wide). These storms appeared in episodes. The first three in early 2004, late 2004 (dragon storm) and early 2006 (observed by Erick Bondoux and Jean-Luc Dauvergne) lasted for a couple of months. The episode beginning in late 2007 and lasting the first half of 2008 was a long episode. With the beginning of 2009 storms were erupting continuously in the southern hemisphere "storm alley" until the eruption of the 2010 GWS in the northern hemisphere. During the Voyager 2 flyby in 1981 a similar "storm alley" was observed in the northern hemisphere (33.5°N–38°N) at the position of the 1903 and 2010 GWSs.

No southern GWS was discovered so far. This could be due to an observational bias in the visibility of the southern hemisphere. In the near future between 2025 and 2038 Saturn's southern hemisphere will be visible, giving observers the possibility to observe a southern GWS. If such southern GWS exists and behaves similar to most northern GWS, the next GWS could occur after May 12, 2032, when the south pole of Saturn is most inclined towards to the sun.

That none were recorded before 1876 is a mystery, in some ways akin to the long observational gap of the Great Red Spot in the 18th and early 19th centuries; the 1876 Great White Spot (GWS) was extremely prominent, being visible in apertures as small as 60 mm. It is not known if the earlier record was simply poor, or if the 1876 GWS was truly a first for the telescopic era. Some believe that neither scenario is likely.

In 1992, Mark Kidger described three significant GWS patterns:

1. The GWSs alternate in latitude, with one apparition being limited to the North Temperate Zone (NTZ) or higher, and the following being limited to the Equatorial Zone (EZ). For instance, the 1960 GWS was high-latitude, and the 1990 GWS was equatorial.
2. The high-latitude GWSs recur at a slightly shorter interval than the equatorial GWSs (~27 versus ~30 years).
3. The high-latitude GWSs tend to be much less prominent than their equatorial counterparts.

Based on these apparent regularities, in 1992 Kidger forecasted (incorrectly, given the 2010–2011 storm) that the next GWS would occur in the North Temperate Zone in 2016, and would probably be less spectacular than the 1990 GWS.

== Characteristics and causes ==
The Great White Spot typically begins as discrete "spots", but then rapidly expands in longitude, as the 1933 and 1990 GWSs did; in fact, the latter eventually lengthened enough to encircle the planet. The storms usually form a complex "head" that grows in size over a few days reaching sizes larger than 10,000 km. This head creates a wake that encircles the planet, creating a planetary-scale storm. The 1990 and 2010 GWSs did rise 40–50 km above the surrounding clouds and were more reflective. This high reflectance suggests that the particles in the storm are coated in fresh water ice.

Though computer modelling had by the early 1990s suggested these massive atmospheric upwellings were caused by thermal instability, in 2015 two Caltech planetary scientists proposed a more detailed mechanism. The theory is that as Saturn's upper atmosphere undergoes seasonal cooling, it first gets less dense as the heavier water rains out, passes a density minimum, and then gets more dense as the remaining hydrogen and helium continue to cool. Low-density upper-layer gases tend to suppress convection, but high-density upper layers are unstable and cause a thunderstorm when they break into lower layers. The theory is that storms are significantly delayed from the winter solstice due to the time it takes for the very large atmosphere to cool. The team proposes that similar storms are not seen on Jupiter because that planet has less water vapor in its upper atmosphere.

The storm head of the 2010 GWS was probably made up by 55% ammonia, 22% water ice, and 23% ammonium hydrosulfide. The water ice is delivered by powerful convections originating from about 200 km deep in Saturn's atmosphere. The 2010 GWS also had an increased level of lightning. It had 10 Saturn Electrostatic Discharges (SED) per second, while synoptic-scale storms on Saturn had a few SEDs per seconds.

Saturn's rings block the view of the northern hemisphere from Earth during the winter solstice, so historical data on the GWS is unavailable during this season, but the Cassini space probe had been able to observe the whole planet since it arrived shortly after the winter solstice in 2004 until its destruction in 2017.

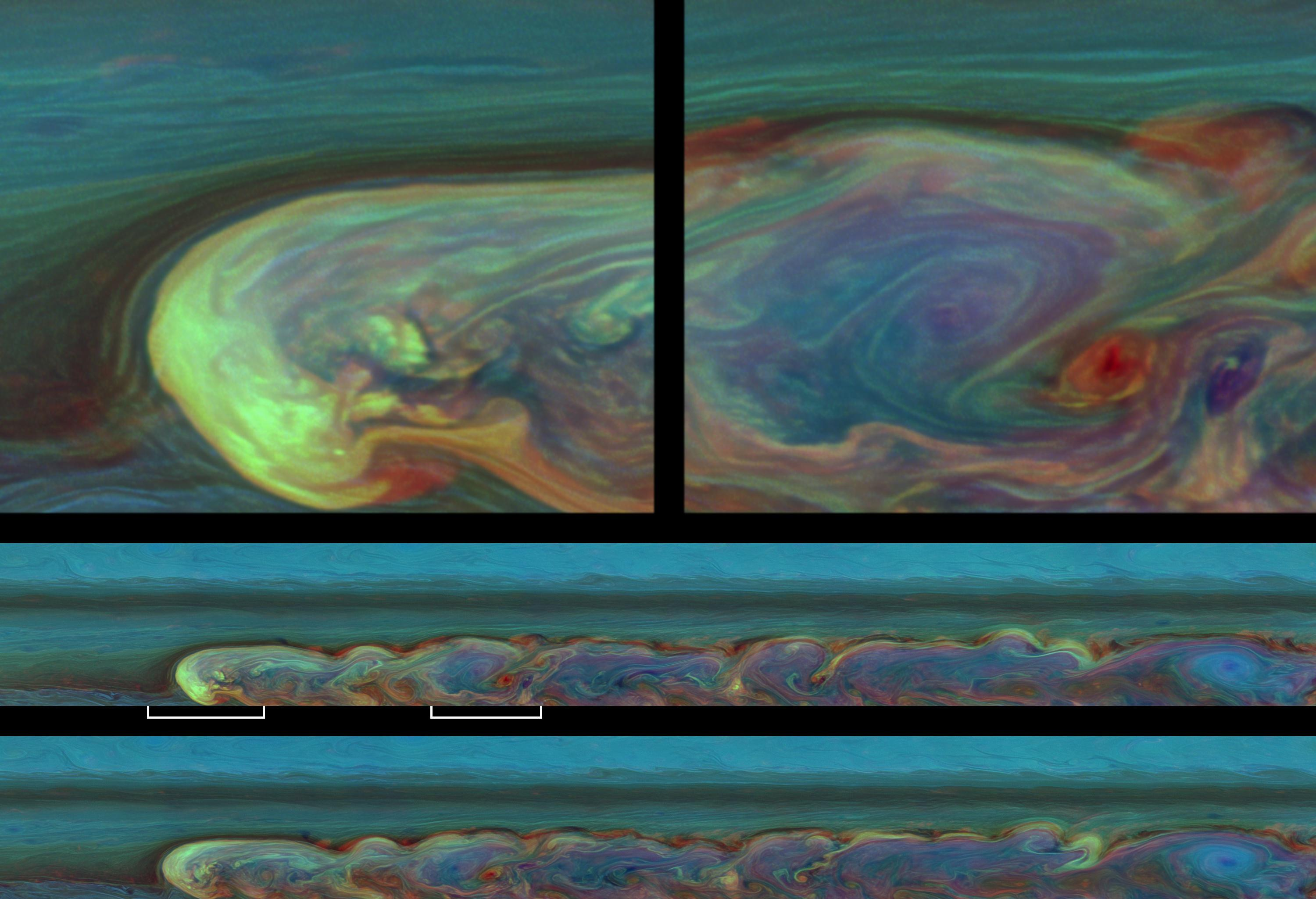
Panorama views of the GWS taken on Feb. 26, 2011 with the Cassini probe. The images show the GWS in near-infrared.

== See also ==
- Great Dark Spot
- Uranus Dark Spot
- Great Red Spot
- Dragon Storm
- Extraterrestrial cyclone
- Kármán vortex street

== Notes ==
- Article on Saturn's Northern Electrostatic Disturbance on Sky and Telescope
- 1990/1 Hubble Space Telescope image
- 2006: observed with a 12" telescope by amateurs near Paris.
- Volunteers Help NASA Track Return of the Dragon
- Kidger, Mark (1992). "The 1990 Great White Spot of Saturn". In Patrick, Moore (ed.). The 1993 Yearbook of Astronomy. New York: W.W. Norton & Company. pp. 176–215. ISBN 978-0-393-03454-7.
- Moché, Dinah (1996). "Chapter 9: Planets". Astronomy: a self-teaching guide (paper) (4th ed.). John Wiley & Sons. p. 245. ISBN 978-0-471-53001-5.
