= Extraterrestrial vortex =

Vortex on non-Earth planets with atmospheres

An extraterrestrial vortex is a vortex that occurs on planets and natural satellites other than Earth that have sufficient atmospheres. Most observed extraterrestrial vortices have been seen in large cyclones or anticyclones. However, occasional dust storms have been known to produce vortices on Mars and Titan. Various spacecraft missions have recorded evidence of past and present extraterrestrial vortices. The largest extraterrestrial vortices are found on the gas giants, Jupiter and Saturn; and the ice giants, Uranus and Neptune.

== Mercury ==
Due to Mercury's thin atmosphere, it does not experience weather-like storms or other atmospheric weather phenomena such as clouds, winds, or rain. Unexpectedly, Mercury does have magnetic 'tornadoes', observed by NASA's Mercury MESSENGER during a flyby in 2008. The tornadoes are twisted bundles of magnetic fields that connect Mercury's magnetic field to space.

== Venus ==
Venus Express observed two large shape-shifting vortices on Venus' poles (polar vortices) in 2006 on one of its close-up flybys of the planet. The south pole was seen to have a large, constantly changing, double-eye vortex through high-resolution infrared measurements obtained by the VIRTIS instrument on Venus Express. The cause of the double-eyed vortex is unknown but the polar vortices are caused by the Hadley Cell atmospheric circulation of the lower atmosphere. Unusually, neither of the double vortices at the south pole ever line up and are located at slightly different altitudes. The southern pole's cyclone-like storm is roughly the size of Europe. In addition, the southern polar vortex is constantly changing shape but the cause is still unknown.

In 1979, NASA's Pioneer Venus observed a double vortex cyclone at the north pole. There have not been many more close-up observations of the north pole since Pioneer Venus.

Since most of the planet's water has escaped to space, Venus does not experience rain like Earth does. However, there has been evidence of lightning on Venus as confirmed by data from Venus Express. The lightning on Venus is different than the lightning on all other planets as it is associated with sulfuric acid clouds instead of water clouds. The magnetometer instrument on Venus Express detected electrical discharges when the spacecraft was orbiting close to the upper atmosphere of Venus. Most storms form high up in the atmosphere about 25 miles from the surface and all precipitation evaporates about 20 miles above the surface.

== Mars ==
Two 2001 images from the Mars Orbiter Camera on NASA's Mars Global Surveyor before and during a global dust storm

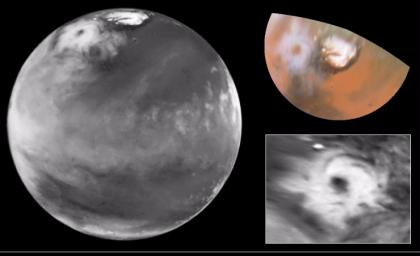
Cyclone on Mars, imaged by the Hubble Space Telescope

Most of the observed atmospheric events on Mars are dust storms which can sometimes disrupt enough dust to be seen from Earth. Many large dust storms occur every year on Mars but even more rare are the global dust storms that Mars experiences on average every 6 Earth years. NASA has observed global dust storms in 1971, 1977, 1982, 1994, 2001, 2007, and 2018. While these massive dust storms do cause problems for rovers and spacecraft operating on solar power, the winds on Mars top out at 100 km (60 mi), less than half as strong as hurricane-force winds on Earth, which is not enough to rip apart mechanical equipment.

While Mars is most known for its recurring dust storms, it still experiences cyclone-like storms and polar vortices similar to Earth.

On April 27, 1999, a rare cyclone 1,800 km (1,100 mi) in diameter was detected by the Hubble Space Telescope in the northern polar region of Mars. It consisted of three cloud bands wrapped around a massive 320 km (200 mi) diameter eye, and contained features similar to storms that have been detected in the poles of Earth (see: polar low). It was only observed briefly, as it seemed to be dissipating when it was imaged six hours later, and was not seen on later imaging passes. Several other cyclones were imaged in about the same area: the March 2, 2001 cyclone, January 19, 2003 cyclone, and the November 27, 2004 cyclone.

In addition, NASA's 2001 Mars Odyssey Spacecraft observed a cold, low density, polar vortex in the planet's atmosphere above latitudes 70 degrees north and higher. NASA determined that every winter a polar vortex forms over the north pole above the atmosphere. The vortex and atmosphere are separated by a transition zone where strong winds encircle the pole and terrestrial jet stream-like characteristics. The stability of these annular polar vortices are still being researched as scientists believe Martian dust may play a role in their formation.

== Jupiter ==
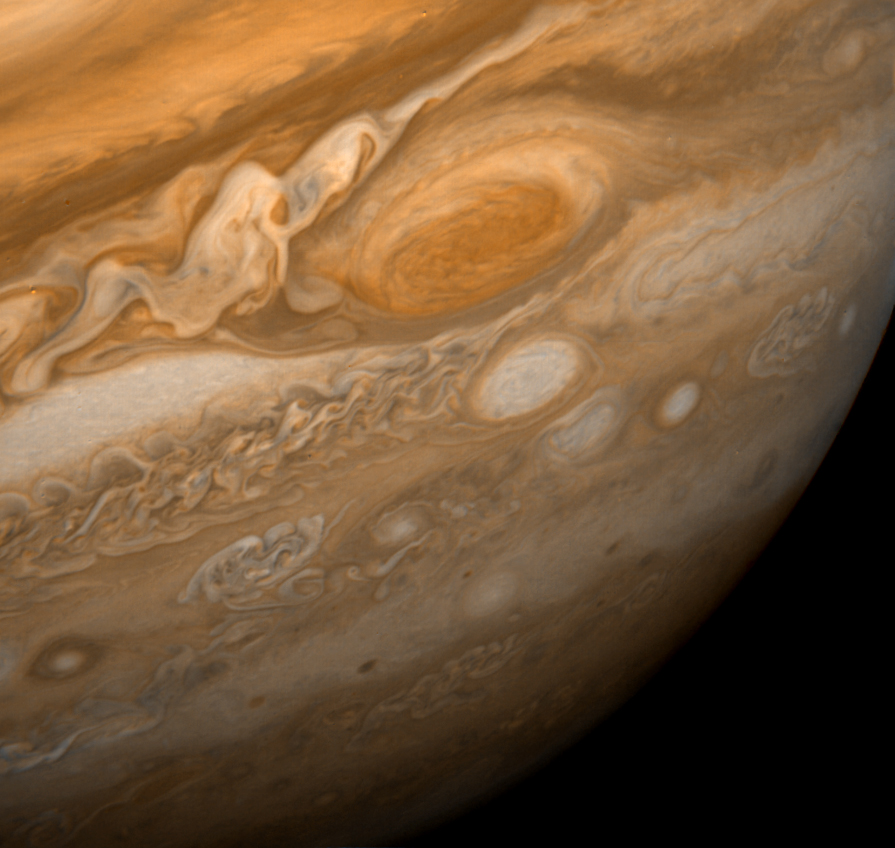
Great Red Spot, captured by Voyager 1, with Oval BA to the south

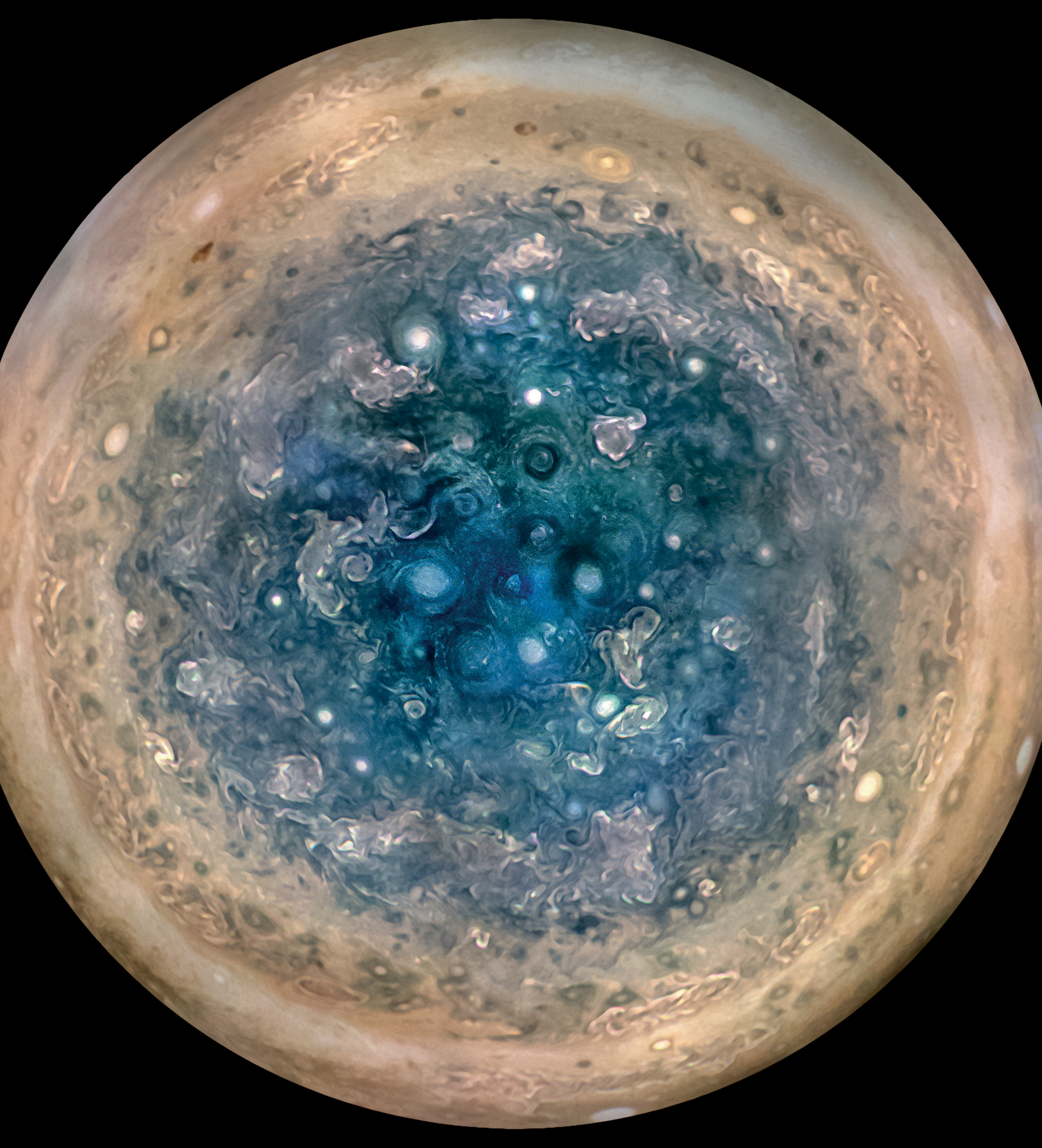
Jupiter's South Polar Vortices, imaged by NASA's Juno Spacecraft

Jupiter's atmosphere is lined with hundreds of vortices most likely to be cyclones, or anticyclones, similar to those on Earth. Voyager and Cassini discovered that, unlike the terrestrial atmosphere, 90% of Jovian vortices are anticyclones, meaning they rotate in the opposite direction of the planet's rotation. Many cyclones have appeared and disappeared over the years, with some even merging to form larger cyclones.

When NASA's Juno Spacecraft arrived at Jupiter in 2016, it observed giant cyclones encircling the north and south poles of the planet. Nine large cyclones were spotted around the north pole and 6 around the south pole. Upon further flybys, Juno spotted another cyclone at the south pole and noticed that 6 of the 7 cyclones formed a hexagonal arrangement around the cyclone at the center of the south pole. Data from Juno has shown that this storm system is stable and there have been no signs of vortices attempting to merge.

The Great Red Spot on Jupiter is, by far, the largest extraterrestrial anticyclone (or cyclone) known. The Great Red Spot is located in the southern hemisphere and has wind speeds greater than any storm ever measured on Earth. New data from Juno found that the storm penetrates into Jupiter's atmosphere about 320 km (200 mi). The giant storm has been monitored since 1830 but has possibly survived for over 350 years. Over 100 years ago, the Great Red Spot was well over two Earths wide but has been shrinking ever since. When Voyagers 1 and 2 flew by in 1979, they measured the massive cyclone to be twice Earth's diameter. Measurements today from telescopes have measured a diameter of 1.3 Earths wide.

Oval BA (or Red Spot Jr.) is the second-largest storm on Jupiter and formed from the merging of 3 smaller cyclones in 2000. It is located just to the south of the Great Red Spot and has been increasing in size in recent years, slowly turning a more uniform white.

The Great Dark Spot is a feature observed near Jupiter's north pole in 2000 by the Cassini–Huygens spacecraft that was a short-lived dark cloud that grew to the size of the Great Red Spot before disappearing after 11 weeks. The phenomenon is speculated by scientists to be a side-effect of strong auroras on Jupiter.

== Saturn ==
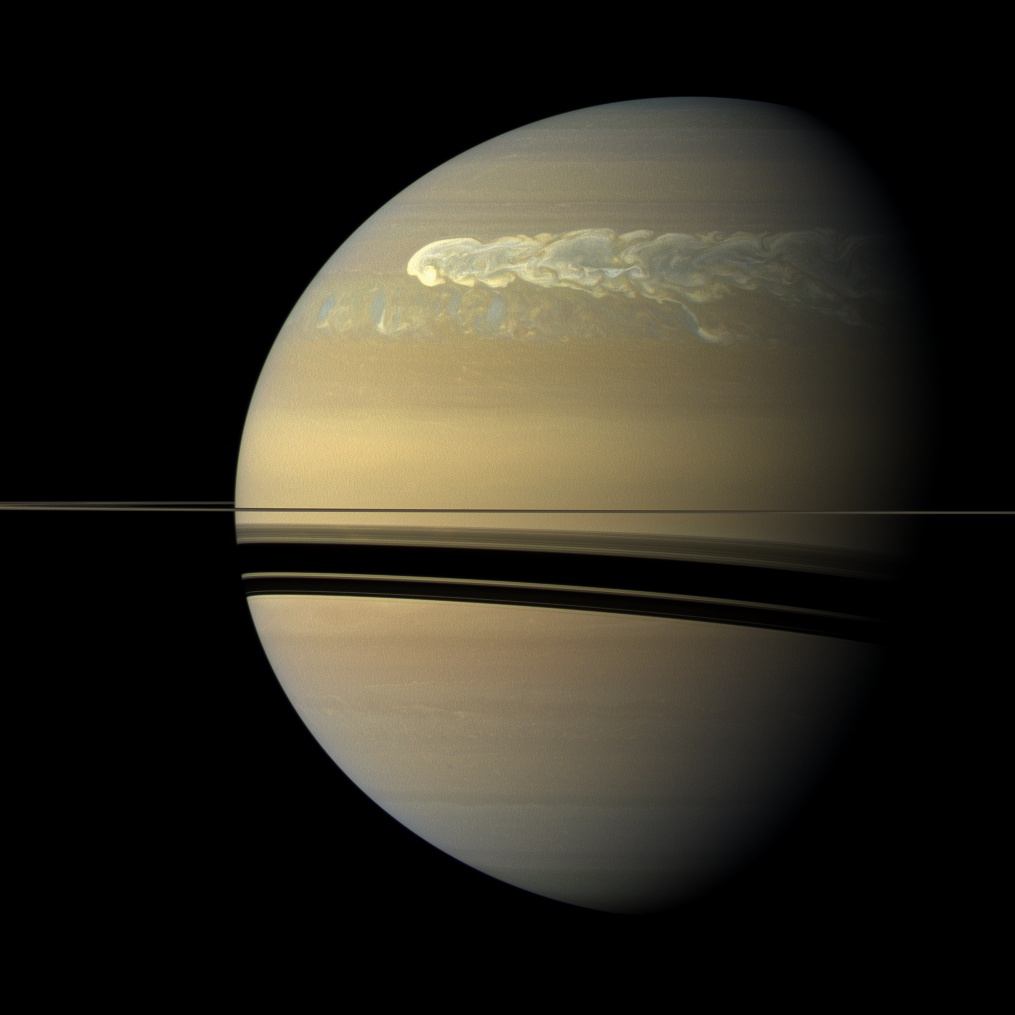
Saturn's Great White Spot, imaged by NASA's Cassini Spacecraft in 2011

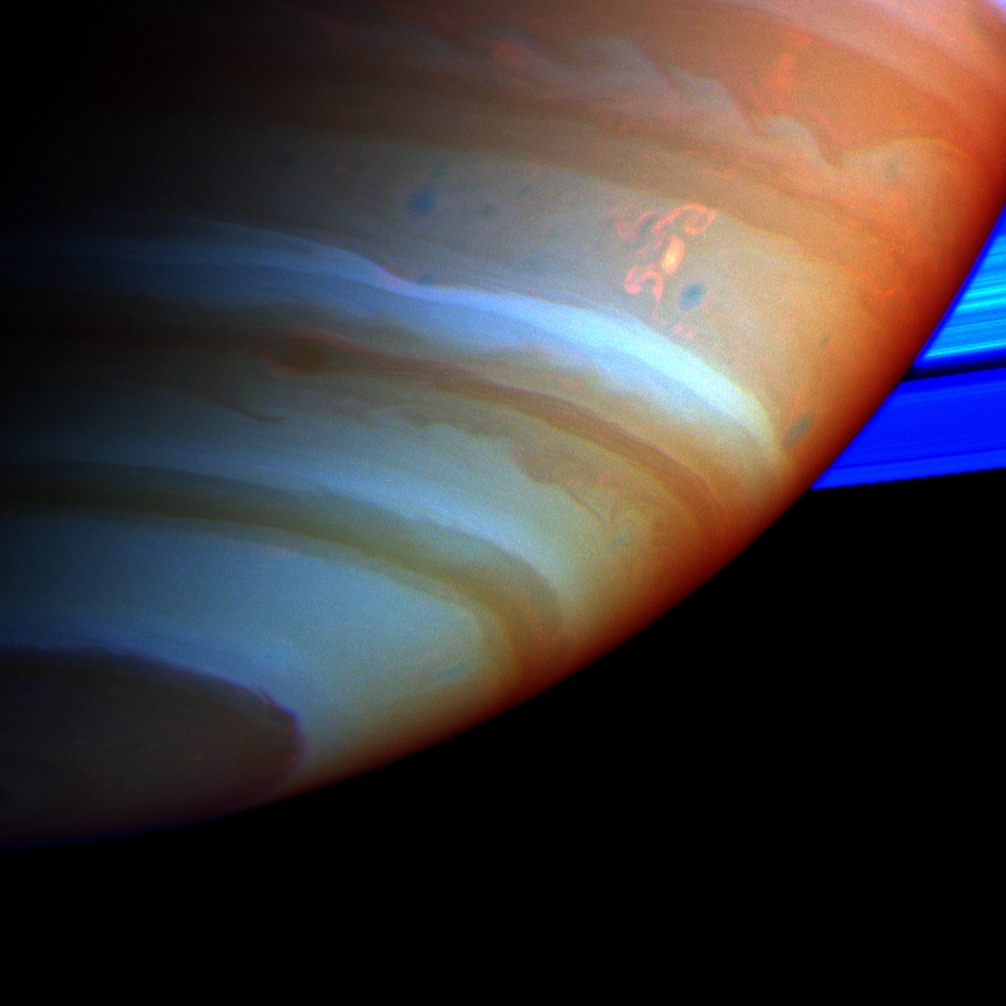
False color image of the Dragon Storm, imaged by Cassini

Every Saturn year, about 28 Earth years, Saturn has massive planet-circling storms, called Great White Spots. The Great White Spots are short-lived but can impact the atmosphere and temperature of the planet for up to 3 Earth years after their collapse. The spots can be several thousand kilometers wide and can even run into their own tails and fade out once they circle the planet.

Most storms on Saturn occur in a zone in the southern hemisphere dubbed 'storm alley' by scientists for its high abundance of storm activity. Storm alley lies 35 degrees south of the equator and it is still unknown why there is such a large quantity of storms that form here. There is also a long-lived storm known as the Dragon Storm, which flares occasionally on Saturn's southern latitudes. Cassini detected bursts of radio emissions from the storm on multiple occasions, similar to the short bursts of static that are produced from lightning on earth.

On October 11, 2006, the Cassini-Huygens spacecraft took images of a storm with a well-defined distinct eyewall over the south pole of Saturn. It was 8,000 kilometres (5,000 mi) across, with storms in the eyewall reaching 70 kilometres (43 mi) high. The storm had wind speeds of 550 kilometres per hour (340 mph) and appeared to be stationary over Saturn's south pole.

Saturn currently holds the record for the longest continuous thunderstorm in the Solar System with a storm that Cassini observed back in 2009 that lasted for over 8 months. Instruments on Cassini detected powerful radio waves coming from lightning discharges in Saturn's atmosphere. These radio waves are about 10,000 times stronger than the ones emitted by terrestrial lightning.

A hexagonal cyclone in Saturn's north pole has been spotted since the passage of Voyager 1 and 2, and was first imaged by Cassini on January 3, 2009. It is just under 24,000 km (15,000 mi) in diameter, with a depth of about 100 km (60 mi), and encircles the north pole of the ringed planet at roughly 78° N latitude.

== Titan ==
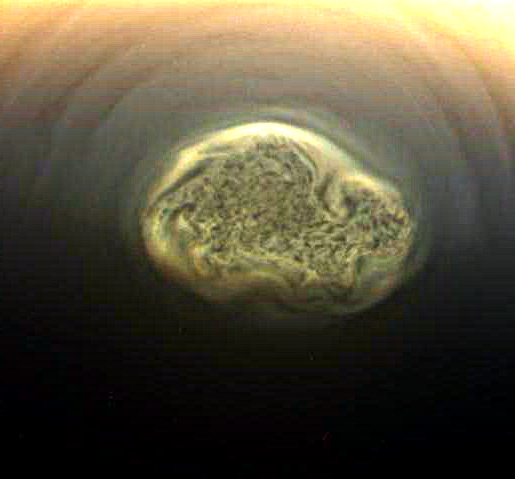
Titan's south polar vortex

In many respects Titan is quite similar to Earth. It is the only known planetary body with both a substantial atmosphere and stable bodies of surface liquid. Titan experiences storms similar to Earth's, but instead of water the working fluids of Titanian weather are liquid and gaseous methane and ethane.

Data from Cassini found that Titan experiences dust storms similar to those on Earth and Mars. When Titan is in equinox, strong down-burst winds raise micron-sized particles up from sand dunes and create dust storms. The dust storms are relatively short but create intense infrared bright spots in the atmosphere, which is how Cassini detected them.

Cassini captured an image of a south polar vortex on Titan in June 2012. Titan was also found to have a northern polar vortex with similar characteristics as the southern polar vortex. Scientists later found that these vortices formed during the winter, meaning they were seasonal, similar to Earth's polar vortices.

The south polar vortex was imaged again in 2013 and it was determined that the vortex forms higher up in the atmosphere than previously thought. The hazy atmosphere that Titan has leaves the moon unilluminated in the Sun's rays but the image of the vortex showed a bright spot on the south pole. Scientists derived that the vortex is high up in the atmosphere, possibly above the haze, because it can still be illuminated by the Sun.

== Uranus ==
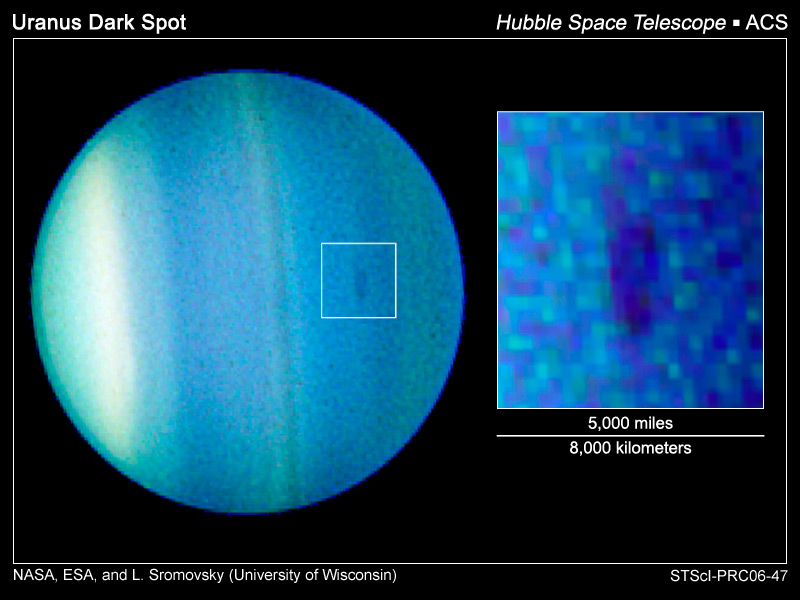
First observed Great Dark Spot on Uranus, imaged by Hubble Space Telescope (False Color)

Uranus was long thought to be atmospherically static due to the lack of storms observed, but in recent years astronomers have started to see more storm activity on the planet. However, there is still limited data on Uranus as it is so far away from Earth and hard to observe regularly.

In 2018, Hubble Space Telescope (HST) captured an image of Uranus that showed a large, bright, polar cap over the north pole. The storm is thought to be long-lived and scientists hypothesize it formed by seasonal changes in atmospheric flow.

In 2006, Hubble Space Telescope imaged the Uranus Dark Spot. Scientists saw similarities between the Uranus Dark Spot (UDS) and the Great Dark Spots (GDS) on Neptune, although UDS was much smaller. GDS were thought to be anticyclonic vortices in Neptune's atmosphere and UDS is assumed to be similar in nature.

In 1998, HST captured infrared images of multiple storms raging on Uranus due to seasonal changes.

== Neptune ==
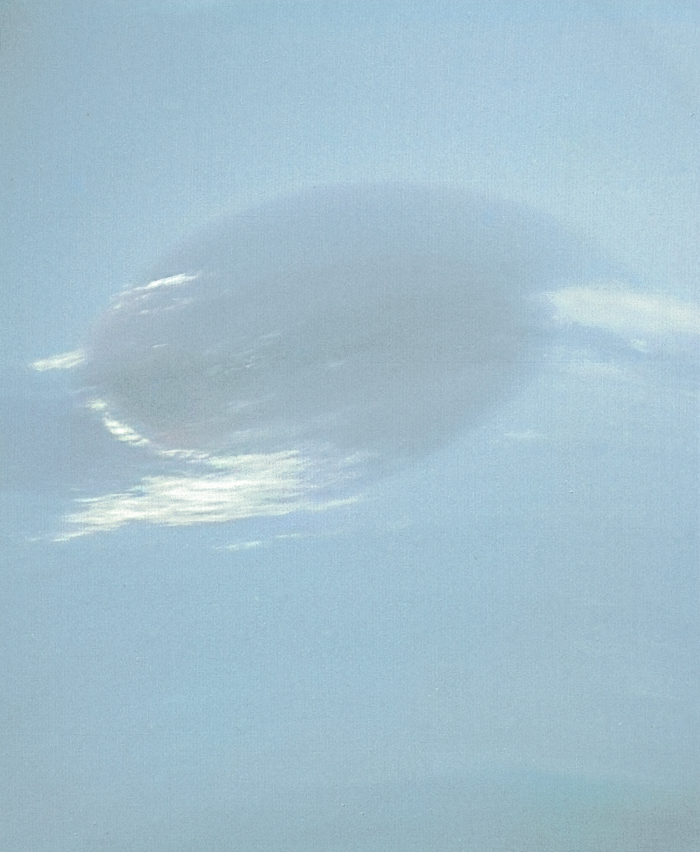
Great Dark Spot

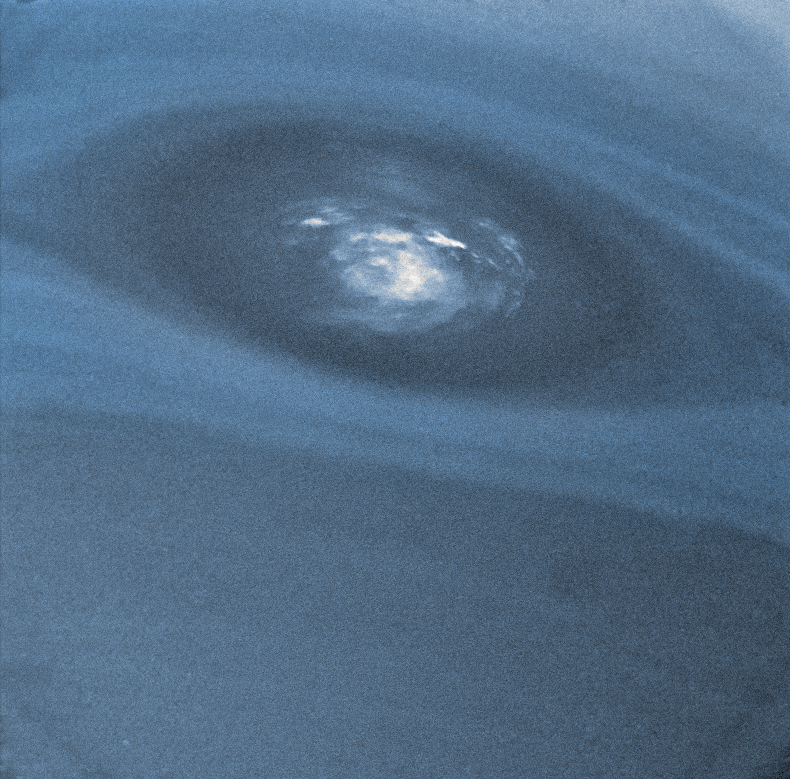
Small Dark Spot (Enhanced Color)

The Great Dark Spot was an Earth-sized vortex observed in the southern hemisphere of Neptune by Voyager 2 in 1989. The storm had some of the highest recorded wind speeds in the Solar System at approximately 2,400 km/h (1,500 mph) and rotated around the planet once every 18.3 hours. When the Hubble Space Telescope turned its gaze to Neptune in 1994, the spot had vanished; but the storm causing the spot might have continued lower in the atmosphere.

The Small Dark Spot (sometimes called Great Dark Spot 2 or Wizard's Eye) was another vortex observed by Voyager 2 in its 1989 pass of Neptune. This spot is located approximately 30° further south on the planet and transits the planet once every 16.1 hours. The Small Dark Spot's distinct appearance comes from white methane-ice clouds which upwell through the center of the storm and give it an eye-like appearance. This storm had also apparently vanished by the time the Hubble Space Telescope inspected the planet in 1994.

A total of 4 additional dark spots have been observed on Neptune since the discovery of the first two. A small storm which formed in the southern hemisphere in 2015 was tracked by Amy Simon and her team at NASA Goddard (she is now part of the Outer Planet Atmospheres Legacy project) from its birth to its death. While focused on tracking this small storm the team was able to discover the emergence of a giant spot the size of the Great Dark Spot at 23° North of the equator in 2018. The observations taken by this team were able to point to the importance of "companion clouds" in identifying the storms that cause these spots even while a dark spot was not present. This team also concluded that the storms have a likely lifespan of 2 years with a life of up to 6 years being possible, and will look to study the shape and speed of dark spots in the future.
