= PG 1612+261 =

Seyfert 1 galaxy in the constellation of Corona Borealis

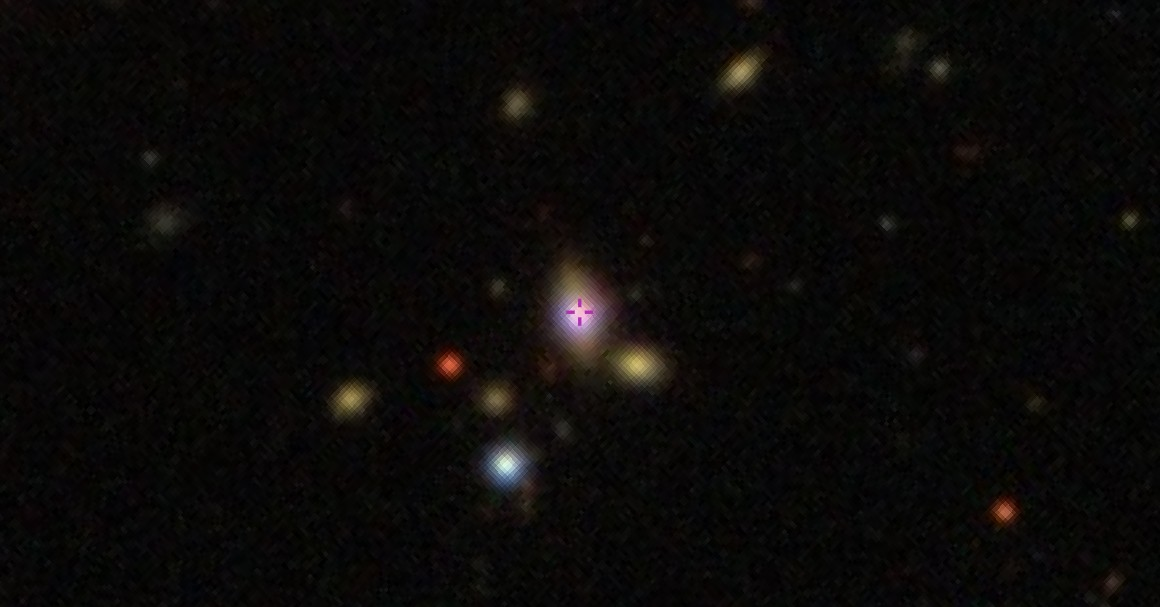
- The seyfert galaxy PG 1612+261.

Observation data (J2000.0 epoch)
- Constellation: Corona Borealis
- Right ascension: 16^{h} 14^{m} 13.200^{s}
- Declination: +26° 04′ 16.209″
- Redshift: 0.130949
- Heliocentric radial velocity: 39,257 km/s
- Distance: 1.689 Gly
- Apparent magnitude (V): 16.50
- Apparent magnitude (B): 16.06

Characteristics
- Type: QSO, Sy 1.5
- Apparent size (V): 40.49 kiloparsecs (132,100 light-years) (diameter; SDSS isophote)

Other designations
- RBS 568, PGC 57571, TON 0256, IRAS F16121+2611, NVSS J161413+260415, 1612+261

PG 1612+261 known alternatively as TON 256 (abbreviation of Tonantzintla 256), is a Seyfert 1 galaxy located in the constellation of Corona Borealis. It is located 1.6 billion light-years away from Earth and was first discovered as a blue quasi-stellar galaxy in 1965.

== Description ==
PG 1612+261 is a radio-quiet quasar with a redshift of (z) 0.131. It has a supermassive black hole mass of (2.3±0.6)×10^{8} M_{☉} and a star formation rate of 1.30±0.03 M_{☉} yr^{–1}. Its host galaxy is undisturbed based on H band imaging, with a bright central nucleus. Further evidence also showed it has either a normal or slightly reddened appearance.

The spectrum of PG 1612+261 shows evidence of a helium broad emission feature. The source of the object is described having a steep radio spectrum between 5 and 8.5 GHz frequencies. It is also known to show radio outflows but no traces of broadline region wind.

The radio structure of PG 1612+261 can be described as a triple structure that is being aligned in all directions with a compact faint source having a flux density of 0.17 mJy. There is also presence of diffused radio emission with an extension of 3 kiloparsecs. When revealed by a 8.4 GHz mapping by Very Large Array (VLA), the nuclear component is fully resolved into a double source with a one-sided jet found heading towards southwest. Radio imaging by Very Long Baseline Array (VLBA) at 1.4 GHz found it is found elongated by east to west direction while a 1.6 GHz radio image shows there are two components instead, with the western component having a spectral index of $\alpha^{4.9}_{1.6}$ = −0.28±0.03.

An emission narrow-line region is found surrounding PG 1612+261. Based on studies, the region is found dominated by large scale rotation motion. There is a doubly ionized oxygen line profile located close to the nucleus of PG 1612+261 with a line width of 424±24 km s^{–1}. The radial velocity offset of the line is estimated to be −220±20 km s^{–1}.
