= WISEP J190648.47+401106.8 =

Brown dwarf star

- Artist's conception of WISEP J190648.47+401106.8

Observation data Epoch J2000 Equinox J2000
- Constellation: Lyra
- Right ascension: 19^{h} 06^{m} 48.075^{s}
- Declination: +40° 11′ 08.59″

Characteristics
- Spectral type: L1
- Apparent magnitude (J): 13.078±0.024
- Apparent magnitude (H): 12.260±0.023
- Apparent magnitude (K): 11.771±0.018

Astrometry
Proper motion (μ)	RA: 438.293 mas/yr Dec.: -179.712 mas/yr
Parallax (π)	59.6710±0.1047 mas
Distance	54.66 ± 0.10 ly (16.76 ± 0.03 pc)

Details
Radius	0.92±0.07 R_{Jup}
Luminosity (bolometric)	0.0002 L_{☉}
Temperature	2300±75 K
Rotation	0.37015 d (8.9 hr)
Rotational velocity (v sin i)	11.2±2.2 km/s

Database references
SIMBAD	data

WISEP J190648.47+401106.8 (abbreviated to W1906+40) is an L-type brown dwarf 54.7 light-years (16.8 parsecs) away in the constellation Lyra. It was discovered in 2011, and was the first L-dwarf discovered in the field of view of the Kepler space telescope.

In 2015 it was shown to have on its surface a storm the size of Jupiter's Great Red Spot. The storm rotates around the star roughly every 9 hours and has lasted since at least 2013, when observations of the storm began.

W1906+40 has an intrinsic brightness of 0.02% that of the Sun, a radius of 0.9 times that of Jupiter, and a surface temperature of 2,300 K. The star emits significant flares.
