= Climate of Uranus =

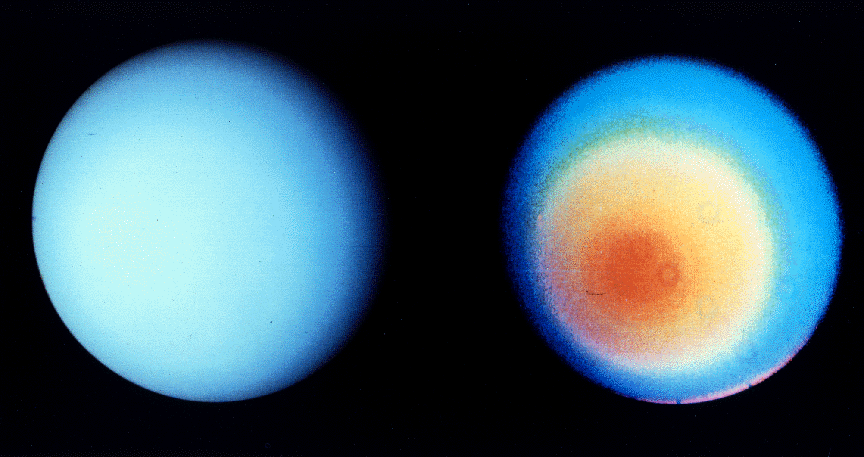
Uranus's southern hemisphere in approximate natural colour (left) and in higher wavelengths (right), showing its faint cloud bands and atmospheric "hood" as seen by Voyager 2

The climate of Uranus is heavily influenced by both its lack of internal heat, which limits atmospheric activity, and by its extreme axial tilt, which induces intense seasonal variation. Uranus's atmosphere is remarkably bland in comparison to the other giant planets which it otherwise closely resembles. When Voyager 2 flew by Uranus in 1986, it observed a total of ten cloud features across the entire planet. Later observations from the ground or by the Hubble Space Telescope made in the 1990s and the 2000s revealed bright clouds in the northern (winter) hemisphere. In 2006, a dark spot similar to the Great Dark Spot on Neptune was detected.

== Banded structure, winds and clouds ==
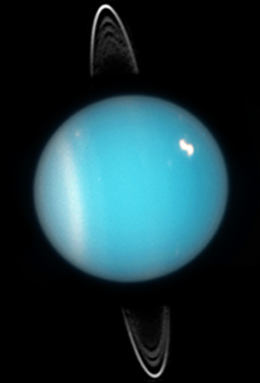
Uranus in 2005. Rings, southern collar and a light cloud in the northern hemisphere are visible.

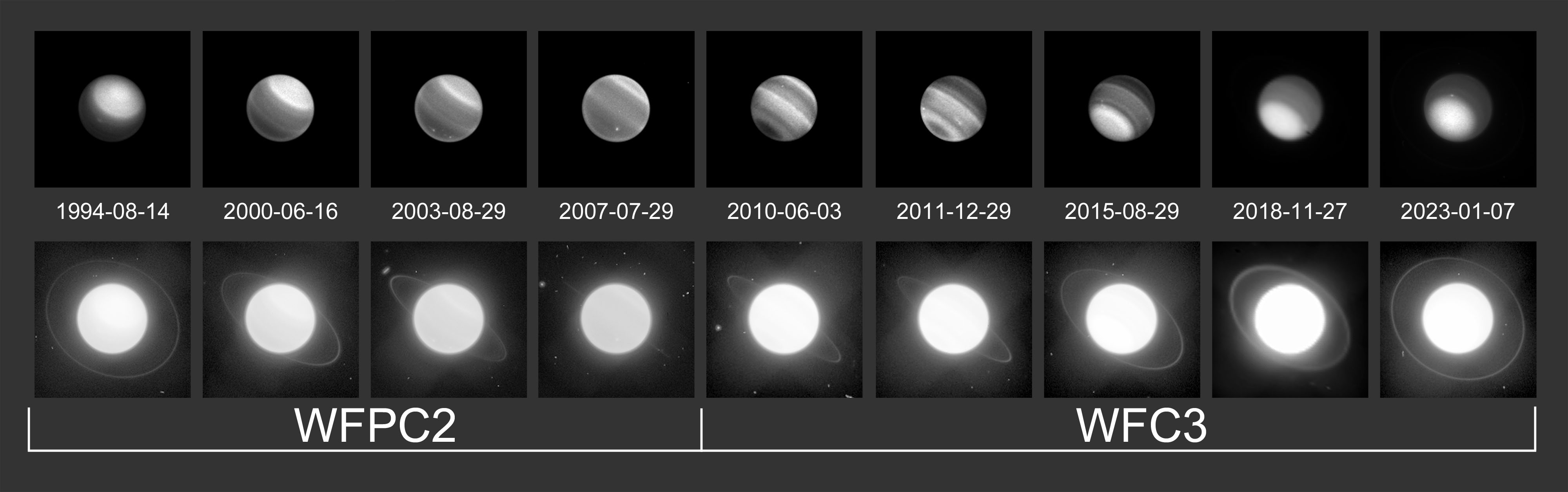
Hubble images showing the seasonal changes in the atmosphere of Uranus. The south of Uranus is at the upper right and north is at the lower left. The south polar cap disappears between 2007 and 2011 and the north polar cap appears between 2010 and 2015.

The first suggestions of bands and weather on Uranus came in the 19th century, such as an observation in March and April 1884 of a white band circling partially around Uranus's equator, only two years after Uranus's "spring" equinox.

In 1986 Voyager 2 discovered that the visible southern hemisphere of Uranus can be subdivided into two regions: a bright polar cap and dark equatorial bands (see figure on the right). Their boundary is located at about −45 degrees of latitude. A narrow band straddling the latitudinal range from −45 to −50 degrees is the brightest large feature on Uranus's visible surface. It is called a southern "collar". The cap and collar are thought to be a dense region of methane clouds located within the pressure range of 1.3 to 2 bar. Unfortunately Voyager 2 arrived during the height of Uranus's southern summer and could not observe the northern hemisphere. However, at the end of 1990s and the beginning of the twenty-first century, when the northern polar region came into view, Hubble Space Telescope (HST) and Keck telescope initially observed neither a collar nor a polar cap in the northern hemisphere. Thus, Uranus appeared to be asymmetric: bright near the south pole and uniformly dark in the region north of the southern collar. In 2007, however, when Uranus passed its equinox, the southern collar almost disappeared, whereas a faint northern collar emerged near 45 degrees of latitude. The visible latitudinal structure of Uranus is different from that of Jupiter and Saturn, which demonstrate multiple narrow and colorful bands.

In addition to large-scale banded structure, Voyager 2 observed ten small bright clouds, most lying several degrees to the north from the collar. In all other respects Uranus looked like a dynamically dead planet in 1986. However, in the 1990s the number of observed bright cloud features grew considerably. The majority of them were found in the northern hemisphere as they started to become visible. The common though incorrect explanation of this fact was that bright clouds are easier to identify in its dark part, whereas in the southern hemisphere the bright collar masks them. Nevertheless, there are differences between the clouds of each hemisphere. The northern clouds are smaller, sharper and brighter. They appear to lie at a higher altitude, which is connected to fact that until 2004 (see below) no southern polar cloud had been observed at the wavelength 2.2 micrometres, which is sensitive to the methane absorption, whereas northern clouds have been regularly observed in this wavelength band. The lifetime of clouds spans several orders of magnitude. Some small clouds live for hours, whereas at least one southern cloud has persisted since the Voyager flyby. Recent observation also discovered that cloud-features on Uranus have a lot in common with those on Neptune, although the weather on Uranus is much calmer.

=== Uranus Dark Spot ===
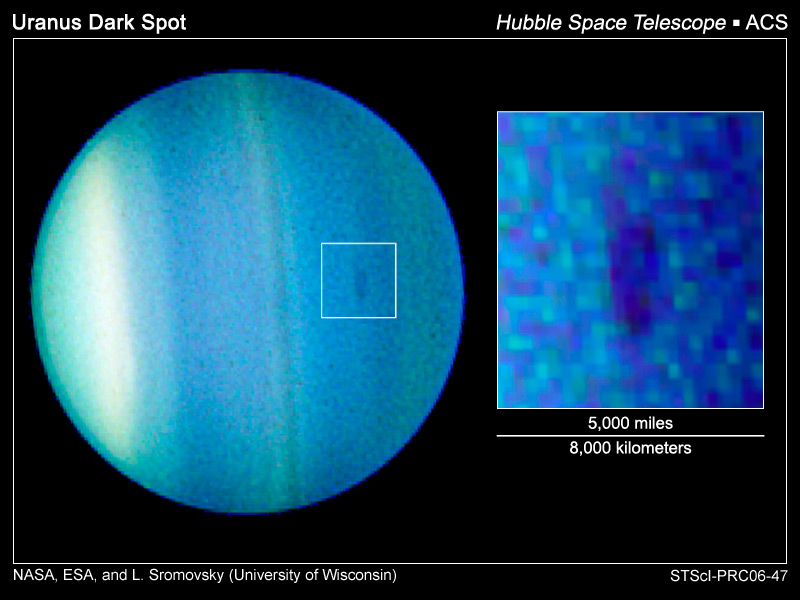
The first dark spot observed on Uranus. Image was obtained by ACS on HST in 2006.

The dark spots common on Neptune had never been observed on Uranus before 2006, when the first such feature was imaged. In that year observations from both Hubble Space Telescope and Keck Telescope revealed a small dark spot in the northern (winter) hemisphere of Uranus. It was located at the latitude of about 28 ± 1° and measured approximately 2° (1300 km) in latitude and 5° (2700 km) in longitude. The feature called Uranus Dark Spot (UDS) moved in the prograde direction relative Uranus's rotation with an average speed of 43.1 ± 0.1 m/s, which is almost 20 m/s faster than the speed of clouds at the same latitude. The latitude of UDS was approximately constant. The feature was variable in size and appearance and was often accompanied by a bright white cloud called Bright Companion (BC), which moved with nearly the same speed as UDS itself.

The behavior and appearance of UDS and its bright companion were similar to Neptunian Great Dark Spots (GDS) and their bright companions, respectively, though UDS was significantly smaller. This similarity suggests that they have the same origin. GDS were hypothesized to be anticyclonic vortices in the atmosphere of Neptune, whereas their bright companions were thought to be methane clouds formed in places, where the air is rising (orographic clouds). UDS is supposed to have a similar nature, although it looked differently from GDS at some wavelengths. Although GDS had the highest contrast at 0.47 μm, UDS was not visible at this wavelength. On the other hand, UDS demonstrated the highest contrast at 1.6 μm, where GDS were not detected. This implies that dark spots on the two ice giants are located at somewhat different pressure levels—the Uranian feature probably lies near 4 bar. The dark color of UDS (as well as GDS) may be caused by thinning of the underlying hydrogen sulfide or ammonium hydrosulfide clouds.

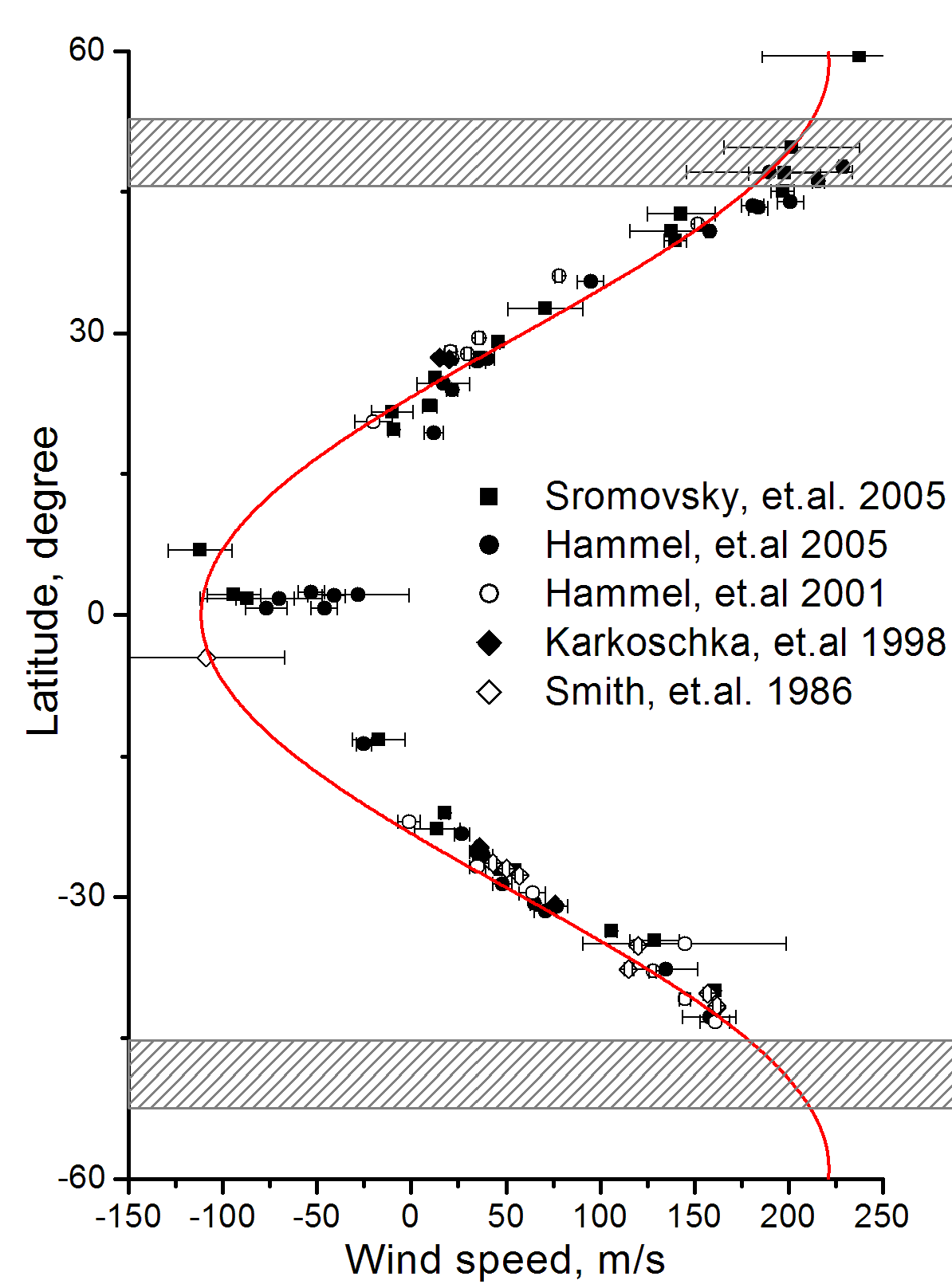
Zonal wind speeds on Uranus. Shaded areas show the southern collar and its future northern counterpart. The red curve is a symmetrical fit to the data.

The emergence of a dark spot on the hemisphere of Uranus that was in darkness for many years indicates that near equinox Uranus entered a period of elevated weather activity.

=== Winds ===
The tracking of numerous cloud features allowed determination of zonal winds blowing in the upper troposphere of Uranus. At the equator winds are retrograde, which means that they blow in the reverse direction to the planetary rotation. Their speeds are from −100 to −50 m/s. Wind speeds increase with the distance from the equator, reaching zero values near ±20° latitude, where the troposphere's temperature minimum is located. Closer to the poles, the winds shift to a prograde direction, flowing with its rotation. Wind speeds continue to increase reaching maxima at ±60° latitude before falling to zero at the poles. Wind speeds at −40° latitude range from 150 to 200 m/s. Because the collar obscures all clouds below that parallel, speeds between it and the south pole are impossible to measure. In contrast, in the northern hemisphere maximum speeds as high as 240 m/s are observed near +50 degrees of latitude. These speeds sometimes lead to incorrect assertions that winds are faster in the northern hemisphere. In fact, latitude per latitude, winds are slightly slower in the northern part of Uranus, especially at the midlatitudes from ±20 to ±40 degrees. There is currently no agreement about whether any changes in wind speed have occurred since 1986, and nothing is known about much slower meridional winds.

== Seasonal variation ==
Determining the nature of this seasonal variation is difficult because good data on Uranus's atmosphere has existed for less than one full Uranian year (84 Earth years). A number of discoveries have however been made. Photometry over the course of half a Uranian year (beginning in the 1950s) has shown regular variation in the brightness in two spectral bands, with maxima occurring at the solstices and minima occurring at the equinoxes. A similar periodic variation, with maxima at the solstices, has been noted in microwave measurements of the deep troposphere begun in the 1960s. Stratospheric temperature measurements beginning in the 1970s also showed maximum values near 1986 solstice.

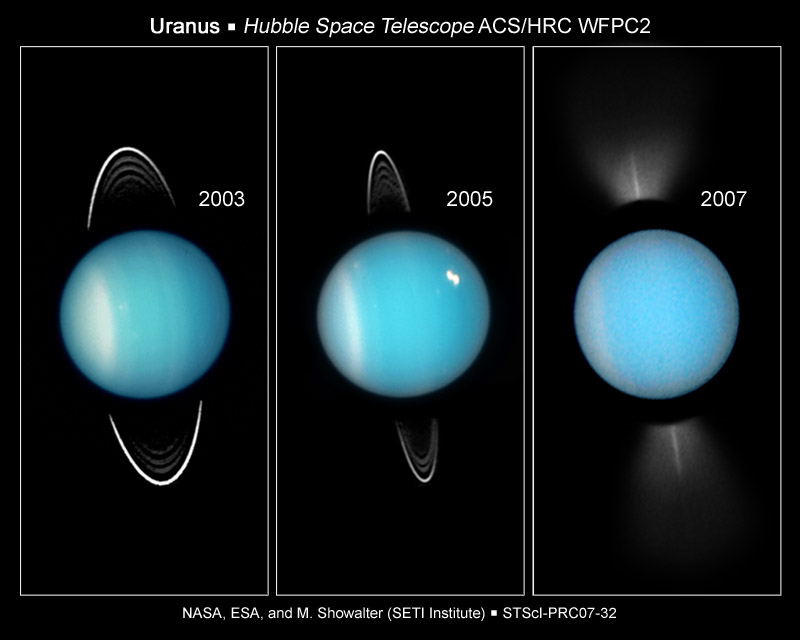
HST images show changes in the atmosphere of Uranus as it approaches its equinox (right image)

The majority of this variability is believed to occur due to changes in the viewing geometry. Uranus is an oblate spheroid, which causes its visible area to become larger when viewed from the poles. This explains in part its brighter appearance at solstices. Uranus is also known to exhibit strong zonal variations in albedo (see above). For instance, the south polar region of Uranus is much brighter than the equatorial bands. In addition, both poles demonstrate elevated brightness in the microwave part of the spectrum, whereas the polar stratosphere is known to be cooler than the equatorial one. So seasonal change seems to happen as follows: poles, which are bright both in visible and microwave spectral bands, come into the view at solstices resulting in brighter planet, whereas the dark equator is visible mainly near equinoxes resulting in darker planet. In addition, occultations at solstices probe hotter equatorial stratosphere.

The visible magnitude of Uranus in two spectral bands (upper graph) adjusted for the distance, effective microwave temperature (middle graph) and the stratospheric temperature (lower graph). Blue band is centered at 470 nm, yellow at 550 nm.

However, there are some reasons to believe that seasonal changes are happening in Uranus. Although Uranus is known to have a bright south polar region, the north pole is fairly dim, which is incompatible with the model of the seasonal change outlined above. During its previous northern solstice in 1944, Uranus displayed elevated levels of brightness, which suggests that the north pole was not always so dim. This information implies that the visible pole brightens some time before the solstice and darkens after the equinox. Detailed analysis of the visible and microwave data revealed that the periodical changes of brightness are not completely symmetrical around the solstices, which also indicates a change in the albedo patterns. In addition, the microwave data showed increases in pole–equator contrast after the 1986 solstice. Finally in the 1990s, as Uranus moved away from its solstice, Hubble and ground-based telescopes revealed that the south polar cap darkened noticeably (except the southern collar, which remained bright), whereas the northern hemisphere demonstrated increasing activity, such as cloud formations and stronger winds, having bolstered expectations that it would brighten soon. In particular, an analog of the bright polar collar present in its southern hemisphere at −45° was expected to appear in its northern part. This indeed happened in 2007 when Uranus passed an equinox: a faint northern polar collar arose, whereas the southern collar became nearly invisible, although the zonal wind profile remained asymmetric, with northern winds being slightly slower than southern.

The mechanism of physical changes is still not clear. Near the summer and winter solstices, Uranus's hemispheres lie alternately either in full glare of the Sun's rays or facing deep space. The brightening of the sunlit hemisphere is thought to result from the local thickening of the methane clouds and haze layers located in the troposphere. The bright collar at −45° latitude is also connected with methane clouds. Other changes in the southern polar region can be explained by changes in the lower cloud layers. The variation of the microwave emission from Uranus is probably caused by changes in the deep tropospheric circulation, because thick polar clouds and haze may inhibit convection.

For a short period in the second half of 2004, a number of large clouds appeared in the Uranian atmosphere, giving it a Neptune-like appearance. Observations included record-breaking wind speeds of 824 km/h and a persistent thunderstorm referred to as "Fourth of July fireworks". Why this sudden upsurge in activity should be occurring is not fully known, but it appears that Uranus's extreme axial tilt results in extreme seasonal variations in its weather.

== Circulation models ==
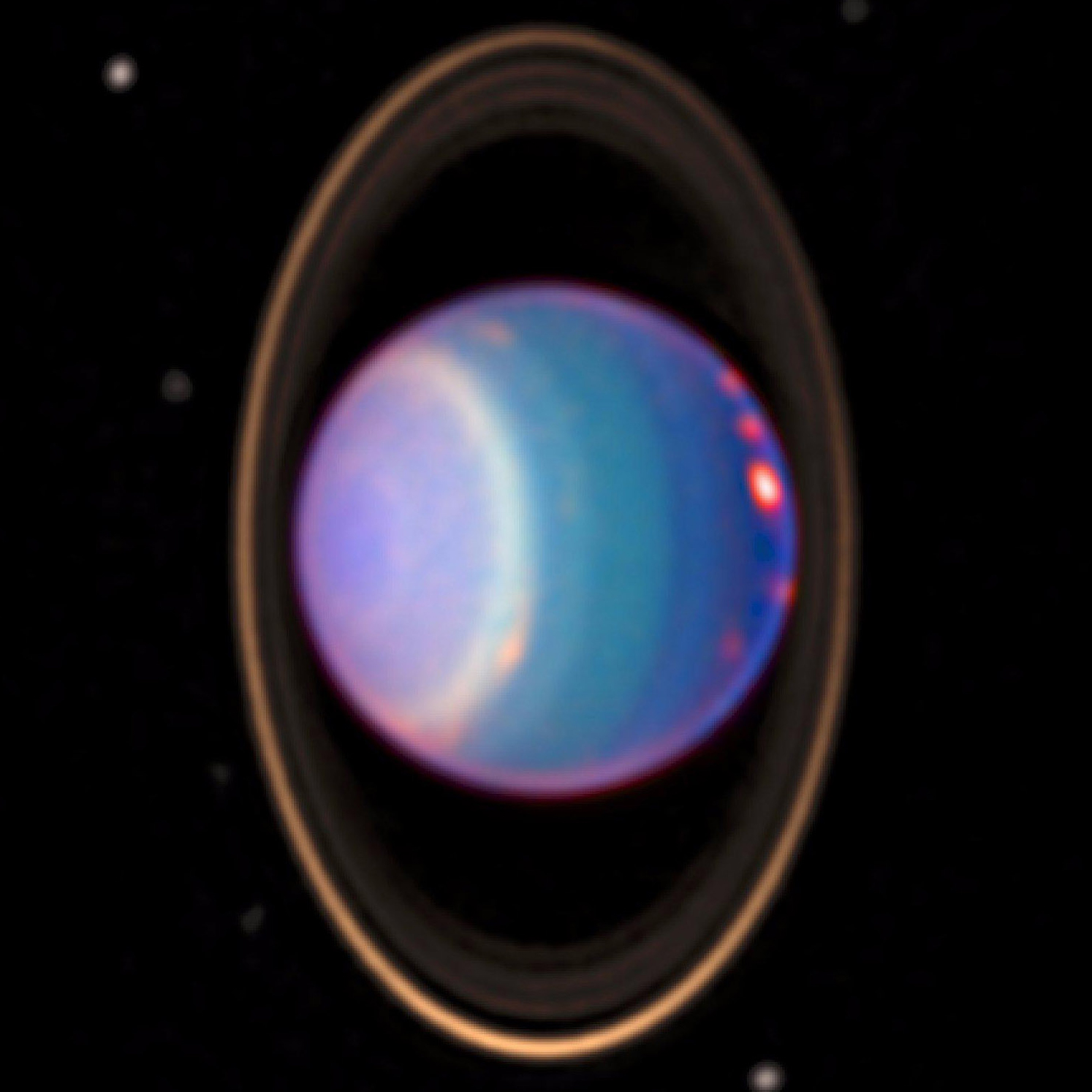
HST image of Uranus taken in 1998 showing clouds in the northern hemisphere

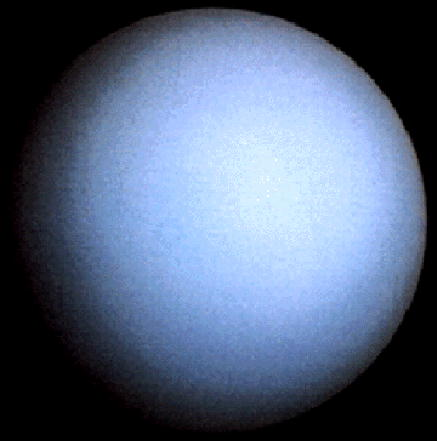
The greenish color of Uranus's atmosphere is due to methane and high-altitude photochemical smog. Voyager 2 acquired this view of the seventh planet while departing the Uranian system in late January 1986. This image looks at Uranus approximately along its rotational pole.

Several solutions have been proposed to explain the calm weather on Uranus. One proposed explanation for this dearth of cloud features is that Uranus's internal heat appears markedly lower than that of the other giant planets; in astronomical terms, it has a low internal thermal flux. Why Uranus's heat flux is so low is still not understood. Neptune, which is Uranus's near twin in size and composition, radiates 2.61 times as much energy into space as it receives from the Sun. Uranus, by contrast, radiates hardly any excess heat at all. The total power radiated by Uranus in the far infrared (i.e. heat) part of the spectrum is 1.06 ± 0.08 times the solar energy absorbed in its atmosphere. In fact, Uranus's heat flux is only 0.042 ± 0.047 W/m^{2}, which is lower than the internal heat flux of Earth of about 0.075 W/m^{2}. The lowest temperature recorded in Uranus's tropopause is 49 K (−224 °C), making Uranus the coldest planet in the Solar System, colder than Neptune.

Another hypothesis states that when Uranus was "knocked over" by the supermassive impactor which caused its extreme axial tilt, the event also caused it to expel most of its primordial heat, leaving it with a depleted core temperature. Another hypothesis is that some form of barrier exists in Uranus's upper layers which prevents the core's heat from reaching the surface. For example, convection may take place in a set of compositionally different layers, which may inhibit the upward heat transport.
