= Great Dark Spot =

Large storm in Neptune's atmosphere

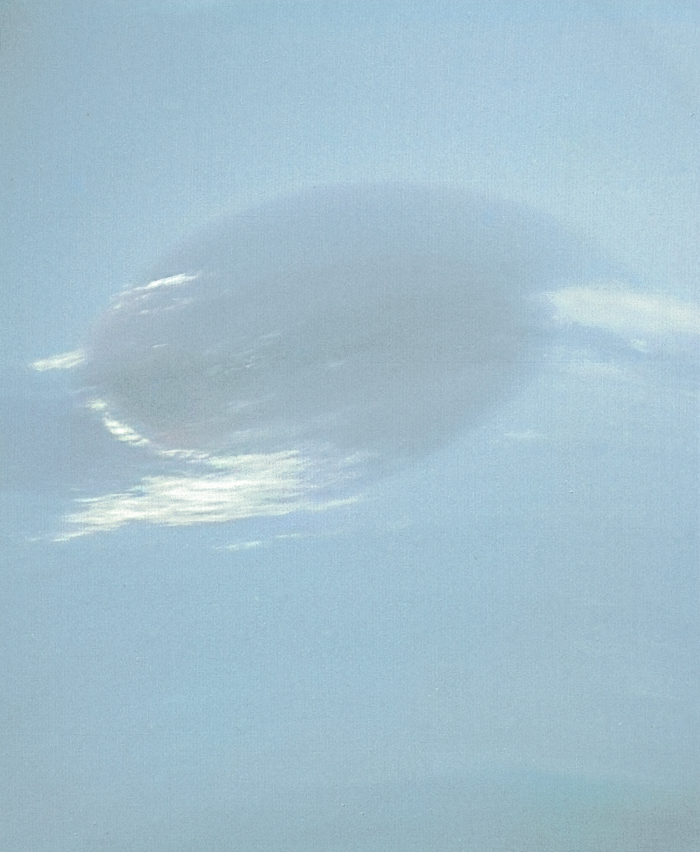
The Great Dark Spot in approximate natural color as seen from Voyager 2

The Great Dark Spot (also known as GDS-89, for Great Dark Spot, 1989) was one of a series of dark spots on Neptune similar in appearance to Jupiter's Great Red Spot. In 1989, GDS-89 was the first Great Dark Spot on Neptune to be observed by NASA's Voyager 2 space probe. Like Jupiter's spot, the Great Dark Spots are anticyclonic storms. However, their interiors are relatively cloud-free, and unlike Jupiter's spot, which has lasted for hundreds of years, their lifetimes appear to be shorter, forming and dissipating once every few years or so. Based on observations taken with Voyager 2 and since then with the Hubble Space Telescope, Neptune appears to spend somewhat more than half its time with a Great Dark Spot. Little is known about the origins, movement, and disappearance of the dark spots observed on the planet since 1989.

== Characteristics ==
The Great Dark Spot was captured by NASA's Voyager 2 space probe in Neptune's southern hemisphere. The dark, elliptically shaped spot (with initial dimensions of 13,000 km × 6,600 km or 8,100 mi × 4,100 mi), was about the same size as Earth, and was similar in general appearance to Jupiter's Great Red Spot. One major difference compared to Jupiter's Great Red Spot is that Neptune's Great Dark Spot has shown the ability to shift north–south over time, while the Great Red Spot is held in the same latitudinal region by global east–west wind currents. Around the edges of the storm, winds were measured at up to 2,100 kilometers per hour (1,300 mph), the fastest recorded in the Solar System. The Great Dark Spot is thought to be a hole in the methane cloud deck of Neptune. The spot was observed at different times with different sizes and shapes.

The Great Dark Spot generated large white clouds at or just below the tropopause layer similar to high-altitude cirrus clouds found on Earth. Unlike the clouds on Earth, however, which are composed of crystals of water ice, Neptune's cirrus clouds are made up of crystals of frozen methane. These high altitude clouds are located somewhere between 50–100 km (31–62 mi) above the main cloud deck. While cirrus clouds usually form and then disperse within a period of a few hours, the clouds in the Great Dark Spot were still present after 36 hours, or two rotations of the planet.

Neptune's dark spots are thought to occur in the troposphere at lower altitudes than the brighter upper cloud deck features. As they are stable features that can persist for several months, they are thought to be vortex structures.

== Disappearance ==
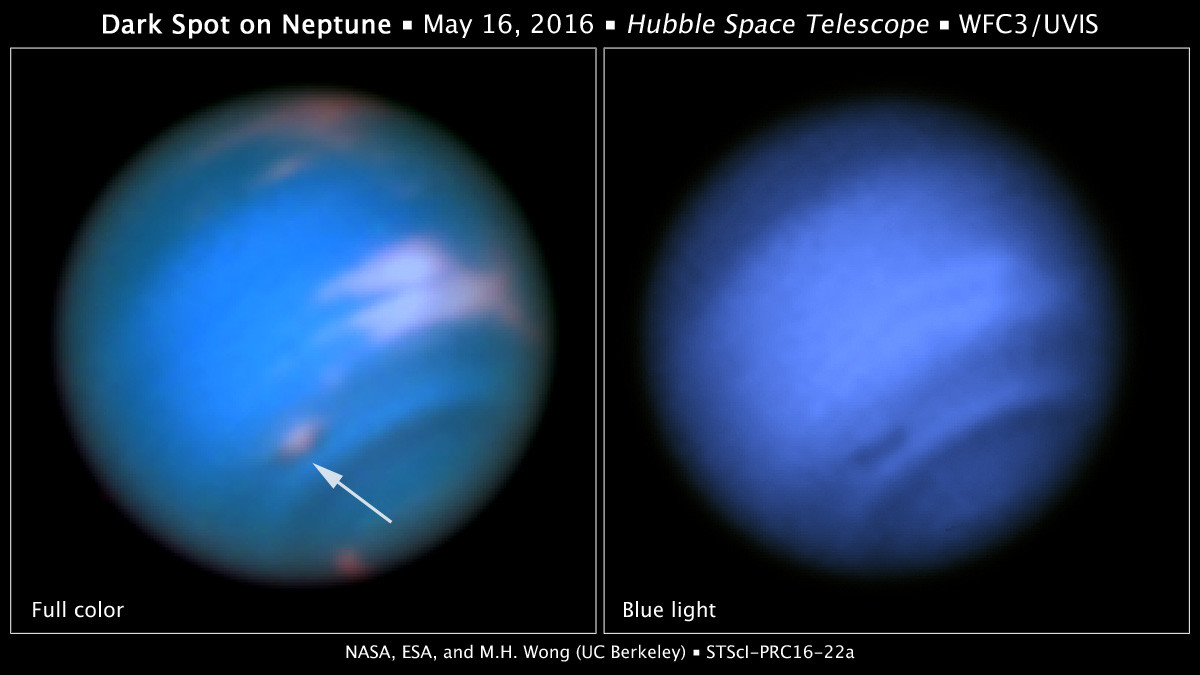
Dark spot on Neptune full color (left) and blue light (right) in a 2016 photo.

When the spot was to be photographed again in November 1994 by the Hubble Space Telescope, it had disappeared completely, leaving astronomers to believe that it had either been covered up or had vanished. The persistence of companion clouds shows that some former dark spots may continue to exist as cyclones even though they are no longer visible as a dark feature. Dark spots may dissipate when they migrate too close to the equator, or possibly through some other unknown mechanisms.

== Other dark spots observed ==
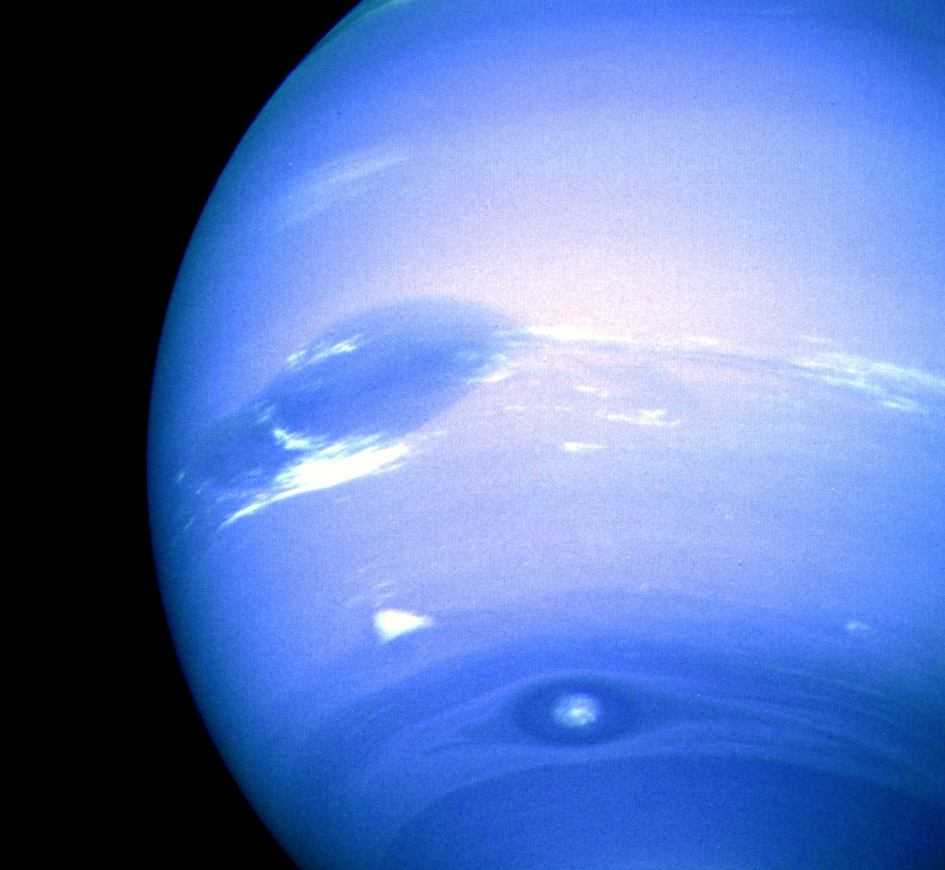
The Great Dark Spot (top), Scooter (middle white cloud), and Dark Spot 2 (bottom), with contrast exaggerated.

Following the Great Dark Spot, several other dark spots have been observed. In 1989, when the Voyager 2 observed the Great Dark Spot (GDS), a second dark spot, Dark Spot 2 (DS2) was found. Dark Spot 2 fully dissipated prior to the year 1994. Beginning in 1994, the Hubble became the only operating facility to detect the presence and observe dark spots on Neptune and is still used to the present day. Hubble is able to view images at blue wavelength, which is the only way features are visible. In 1994, a Northern Dark Spot (NGDS-1994) formed in the northern hemisphere and disappeared between 1998 and 2000. The storm for its duration showed to be stable in latitude. In 1996, a separate Northern Dark Spot (NGDS-1996) formed and was observed until its disappearance, which occurred prior to 1998. Similarly to the prior dark spot, this one exhibited little to no meridional drift. In 2015, a Southern Dark Spot (SDS) was discovered by the Hubble Outer Planet Atmosphere Legacy (OPAL) program. The Southern Dark Spot exhibited a poleward drift before its disappearance in 2017. In 2016, an almost identical spot as the Great Dark Spot (GDS) emerged in Neptune's northern hemisphere. This new spot, called the Northern Great Dark Spot (NGDS), has remained visible for several years. It is unknown whether this spot is still present on the planet, as observations using the Hubble telescope are limited.

More recently, in 2018, a newer main dark spot and a smaller dark spot were identified and studied. This discovery of the dark spot in Neptune's northern hemisphere was monumental in that it was the first dark spot that the Hubble Telescope was able to document from birth. The storm is much smaller in comparison than the one discovered by NASA's Voyager 2, but was found to be larger in diameter than the Atlantic Ocean at approximately 4,600 miles across. In August 2020, the new Great Dark Spot suddenly stopped its southward motion and reversed direction, contrary to projections that the storm would continue to the equator, where it would have met its likely demise. It is believed that the storms remain stable in the northern hemisphere due to the effect of Coriolis forces. However, as the storms moved towards the equator, the Coriolis forces weakened, causing the storms to dissipate.

Around the same time, a smaller "Dark Spot Jr." was found near the larger storm, before disappearing later on. Dark Spot Jr. as the name suggests was smaller than the prior dark spot, only measuring 3,900 miles in diameter. The coincidental appearance of this storm led astronomers to believe that the prior storm's reversal of motion may have been related to the birth of the smaller storm.

While the formation of the storms is still under investigation, it had been concluded from observations regarding the Southern Dark Spot (SDS-2015) and Northern Great Dark Spot (NGDS-2018) that their origins are preceded by an increase in cloud activity in the given region 2–3 years prior to becoming visible. The storms from 1989 to 2018 have exhibited different movement patterns and are generally only visible for a few years. Furthermore, the disappearance of dark spots including the Southern Dark Spot can be linked to companion clouds reaching the center of the storm and blocking the view of the blue wavelengths that are used to track the vortex, prior to their disappearance.

== Proposed missions ==
Two mission ideas have been proposed to NASA to visit Neptune in the coming years. Trident was proposed in 2021 as a discovery mission to visit Neptune and its moon Triton in 2038, but two missions to Venus (DAVINCI and VERITAS) were selected over it. Neptune Odyssey is a flagship orbiter mission concept with similar goals as Trident and is targeted for a launch date of 2033. These missions have a high focus on learning more about Neptune's largest moon Triton, but also aim to gain more information about the atmosphere of Neptune. An analysis of a nuclear-electric propulsion mission to Neptune was published by the China National Space Administration.

== See also ==
- Dragon Storm (astronomy)
- Extraterrestrial cyclone
- Great Red Spot, a similar storm on Jupiter
- Great White Spot, a similar storm on Saturn
- Hypercane, a hypothetical class of exceptionally-large tropical cyclones on Earth
- Oval BA
- Small Dark Spot
