= Great Red Spot =

Persistent storm in Jupiter's atmosphere

Coordinates: 22°S 55°W

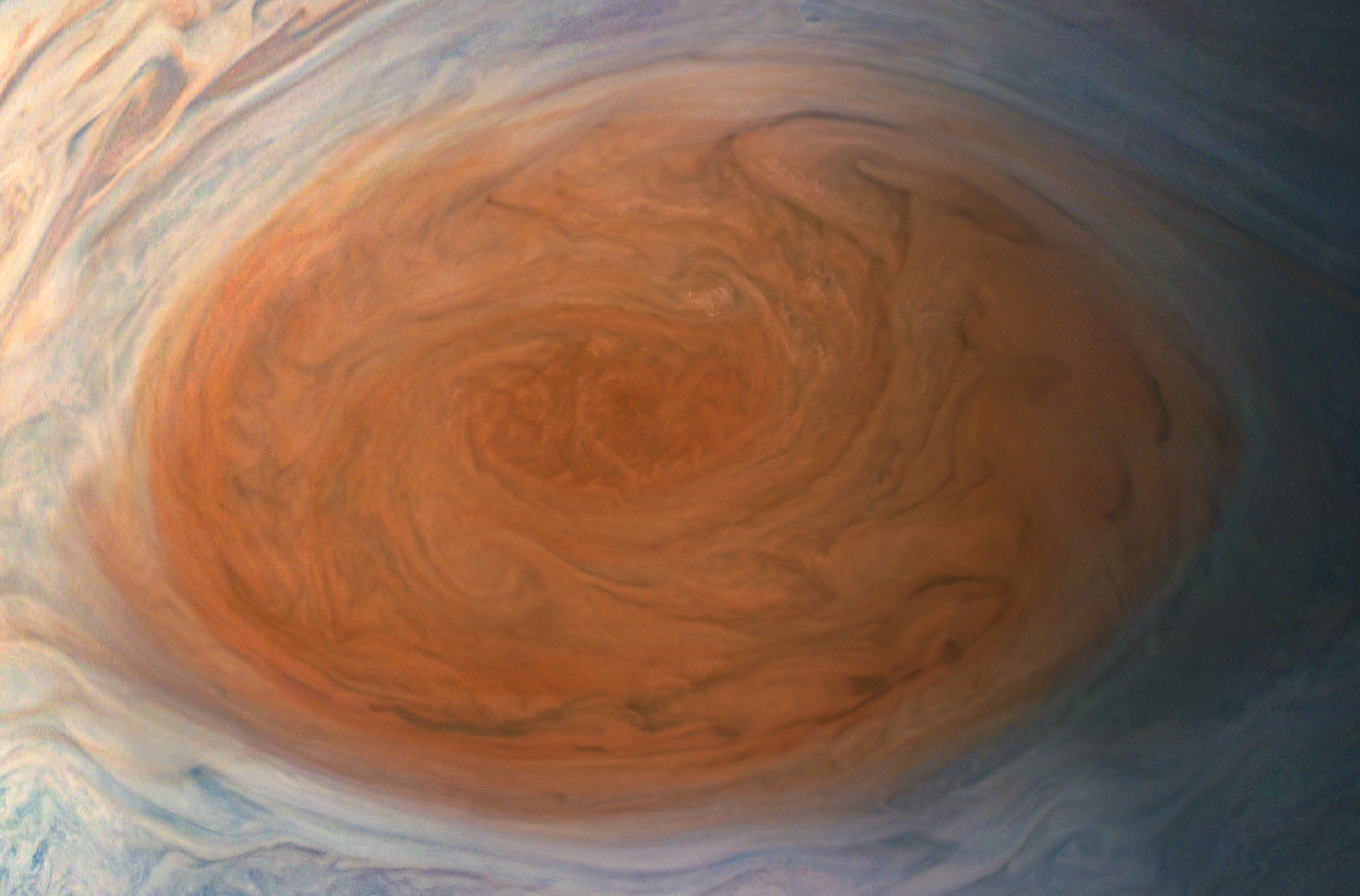
Close up view of the Great Red Spot by Juno

The Great Red Spot is a persistent, elliptical high-pressure region in the atmosphere of the planet Jupiter, producing the largest anticyclonic storm in the Solar System. It is the most recognizable feature on Jupiter owing to its red-orange color, whose origin is due to a sunburn effect, in which high-altitude chemical compounds are blasted by solar radiation. Located 22 degrees south of Jupiter's equator, it produces wind speeds up to 496 km/h (308 mph). It was first observed in September 1831, with 60 recorded observations between then and 1878, when continuous observations began. A similar spot was observed from 1665 to 1713; if this is the same storm, it has existed for at least 361 years, but a study from 2024 suggested this is not the case.

== Observation history ==
=== First observations ===
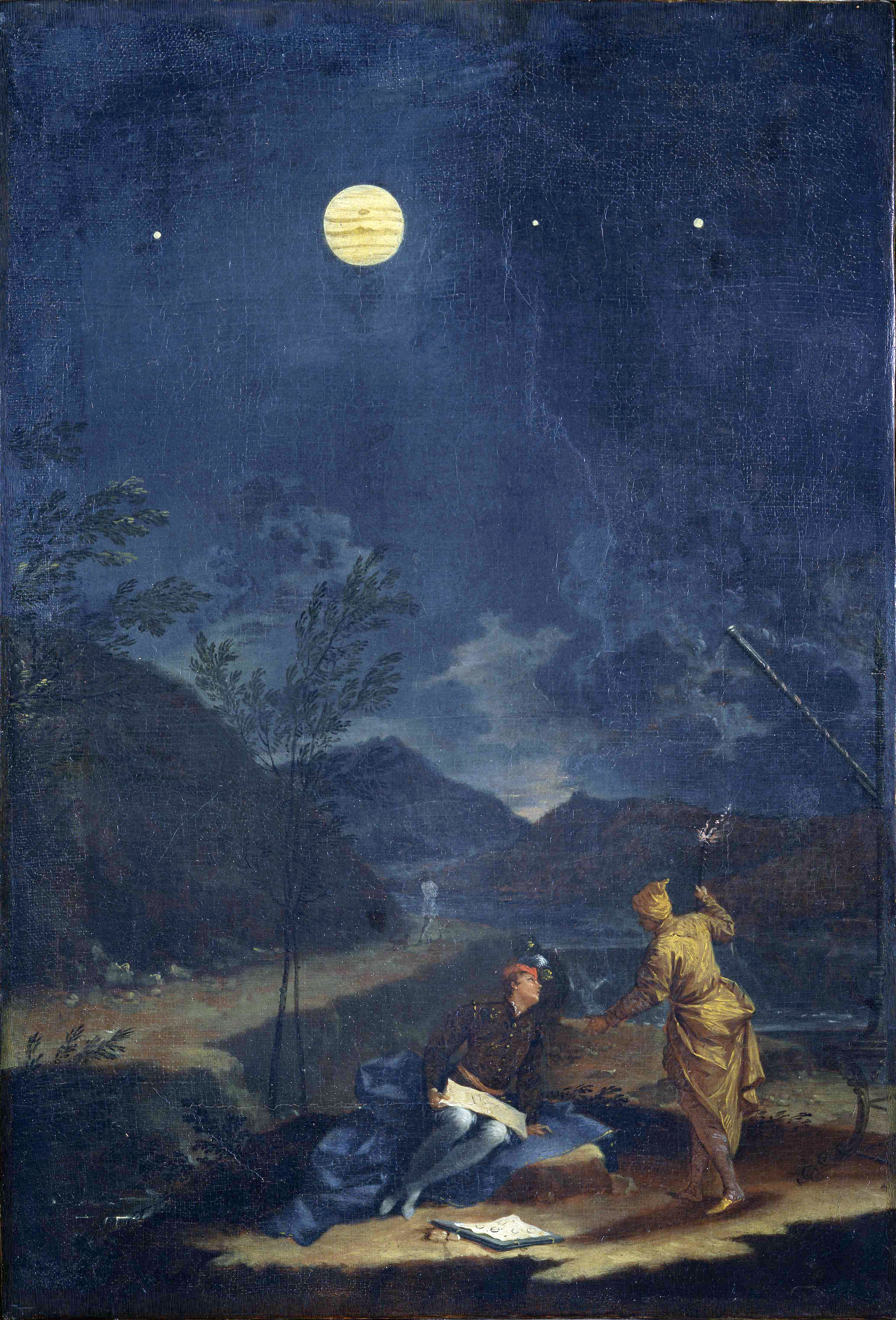
Donato Creti's 1711 painting "Jupiter", the first depiction of a large spot on Jupiter as red

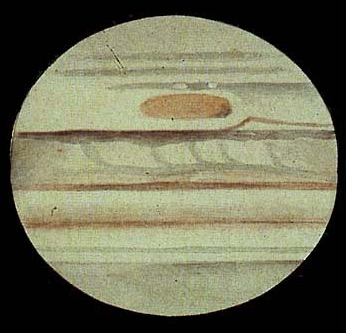
A sketch of Jupiter made by Thomas Gwyn Elger in November 1881, showing the Great Red Spot

The Great Red Spot may have existed before 1664, but it could be that the present spot was first seen only in 1830, and was well studied only after a prominent appearance in 1879. The storm that was seen in the 17th century may have been different from the storm that exists today. A long gap separates its period of current study after 1830 from the 17th century discovery. It is unknown whether the original spot dissipated and reformed, whether it faded away, or whether observers between the late 17th century and early 19th century simply failed to study and record it.

The first sighting of the Great Red Spot is often credited to Robert Hooke, who described a spot on the planet in May 1664. However, it is likely that Hooke's spot was not only in another belt altogether (the North Equatorial Belt, as opposed to the current Great Red Spot in the South Equatorial Belt), but also that it was in the shadow of a transiting moon, most likely Callisto. In the following year, Giovanni Cassini describes "a permanent [spot] which was often seen to return in the same place with the same size and shape", calculating its rotation period to be 9 h 56 min. With fluctuations in visibility, Cassini's spot was observed from 1665 to 1713, but the 48-year observational gap makes the identity of the two spots inconclusive. Because of the older spot's shorter observational history and slower motion than the modern spot, it is difficult to conclude that they are the same.

A minor mystery concerns a Jovian spot depicted in a 1711 canvas by Donato Creti, which is exhibited in the Vatican. It is part of a series of panels in which different (magnified) heavenly bodies serve as backdrops for various Italian scenes, all overseen by the astronomer Eustachio Manfredi for accuracy, Creti's painting is the first known depiction of a large spot on Jupiter as red (albeit raised to the Jovian northern hemisphere due to an optical inversion inherent to the era's telescopes). No Jovian feature was explicitly described in writing as red before the late 19th century.

The Great Red Spot has been frequently observed since 5 September 1831, with over 60 observations recorded by 1879, when it came into popular prominence. Since then, it has been under continuous observation.

A 2024 study of historical observations suggests that the "permanent spot" observed from 1665 to 1713 may not be the same as the modern Great Red Spot observed since 1831. It is suggested that the original spot disappeared, and later another spot formed, the one seen today.

=== Late 20th and 21st centuries ===
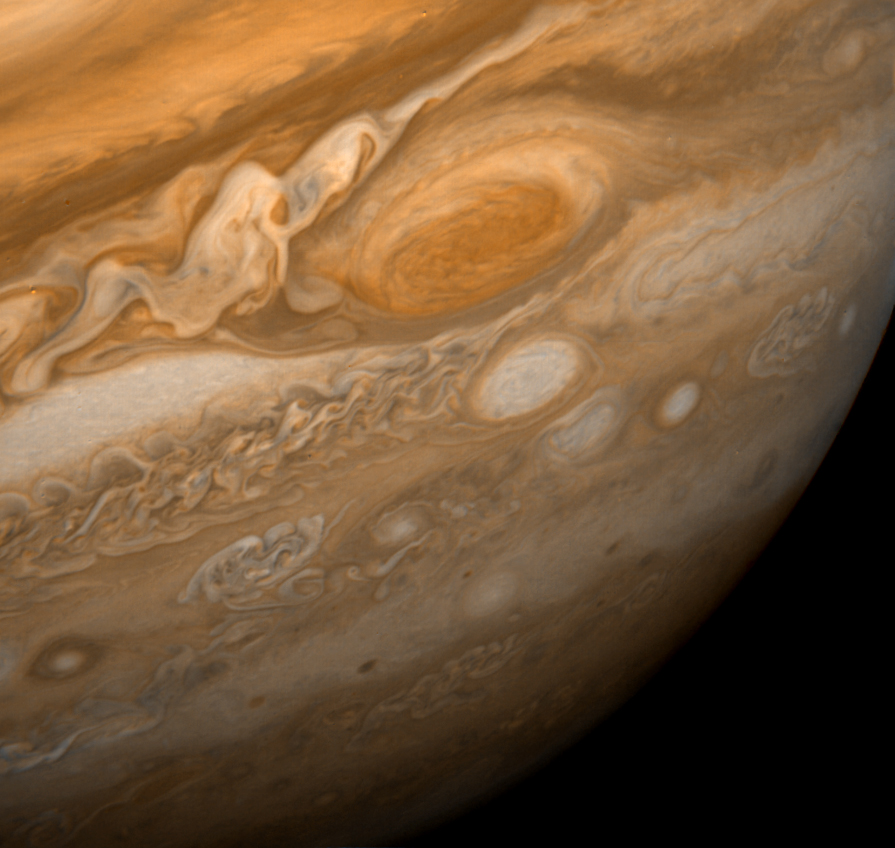
A wide view of Jupiter and the Great Red Spot as seen from Voyager 1 in 1979

On 25 February 1979, when the Voyager 1 spacecraft was 9,200,000 km (5,700,000 mi) from Jupiter, it transmitted the first detailed image of the Great Red Spot. Cloud details as small as 160 km (100 mi) across were visible. The colorful, wavy cloud pattern seen to the left (west) of the Red Spot is a region of extraordinarily complex and variable wave motion.

In the 21st century, the major diameter of the Great Red Spot has been observed to be shrinking. In 2004 its length was about half that of a century earlier, when it reached a size of 40,000 km (25,000 mi), about three times the diameter of Earth. At the present rate of reduction, it will become circular by 2040.

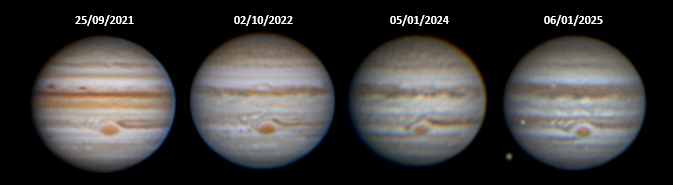
A sequence of images of Jupiter showing the shrinking and rounding of the GRS, between 2021 and 2025. Captured with an 8" untracked Dobsonian telescope.

It is not known how long the spot will last, nor whether the change is a result of periodic fluctuations. In 2019, the spot began "flaking" at its edge, with fragments of the storm spinning off and dissipating. The shrinking and "flaking" fueled speculation from some astronomers that the spot could dissipate within decades. However, other astronomers believe the apparent size of the spot reflects its cloud coverage and not the size of the underlying vortex, and also that the flaking events can be explained by interactions with other cyclones or anticyclones, including incomplete absorptions of smaller systems; this might mean that the Great Red Spot is not in danger of dissipating.

A smaller spot, designated Oval BA, which formed in March 2000 from the merging of three white ovals, has turned reddish in color. Astronomers have named it the Little Red Spot or Red Jr. As of 5 June 2006, the Great Red Spot and Oval BA appeared to be approaching convergence. The storms pass each other about every two years, but the passings of 2002 and 2004 were of little significance. Amy Simon-Miller, of the Goddard Space Flight Center, predicted the storms would have their closest passing on 4 July 2006. She worked with Imke de Pater and Phil Marcus of UC Berkeley as well as a team of professional astronomers beginning in April 2006 to study the storms using the Hubble Space Telescope; on 20 July 2006, the two storms were photographed passing each other by the Gemini Observatory without converging. In May 2008, a third storm turned red.

The Juno spacecraft, which entered into a polar orbit around Jupiter in 2016, flew over the Great Red Spot upon its close approach to Jupiter on 11 July 2017, taking several images of the storm from a distance of about 8,000 km (5,000 mi) above the surface. Over the duration of the Juno mission, which is ongoing, the spacecraft has continued to study the composition and evolution of Jupiter's atmosphere, especially the Great Red Spot.

The Great Red Spot should not be confused with the Great Dark Spot, a feature observed near the northern pole of Jupiter in 2000 with the Cassini–Huygens spacecraft. There is also a feature in the atmosphere of Neptune called the Great Dark Spot. The latter feature was imaged by Voyager 2 in 1989 and may have been an atmospheric hole rather than a storm. It disappeared by 1994, although a similar spot had appeared farther to the north.

== Mechanical dynamics ==
Time-lapse sequence representing 28 days from the approach of Voyager 1 to Jupiter in early 1979, showing the motion of atmospheric bands and the circulation of the Great Red Spot. The momentary black spots are shadows cast by Jupiter's moons.

Jupiter's Great Red Spot rotates counterclockwise, with a period of about 4.5 Earth days, or 11 Jovian days, as of 2008. Measuring 16,350 km (10,160 mi) in width as of 3 April 2017, the Great Red Spot is 1.3 times the diameter of Earth. The cloud-tops of this storm are about 8 km (5 mi) above the surrounding cloud-tops. The storm has continued for centuries in part because there is no planetary surface (only a mantle of hydrogen) to cause friction; circulating atmospheric eddies persist because there is nothing to oppose their angular momentum.

Infrared data has long indicated that the Great Red Spot is colder (and thus higher in altitude) than most of the other clouds on the planet. The upper atmosphere above the storm, however, has substantially higher temperatures than the rest of the planet. Acoustic waves rising from the turbulence of the storm below have been proposed as an explanation for the heating of this region. The acoustic waves travel vertically up to a height of 800 km (500 mi) above the storm where they break in the upper atmosphere, converting wave energy into heat. This creates a region of upper atmosphere that is 1,600 K (1,330 °C; 2,420 °F)—several hundred kelvins warmer than the rest of the planet at this altitude. The effect is described as like "crashing [...] ocean waves on a beach".

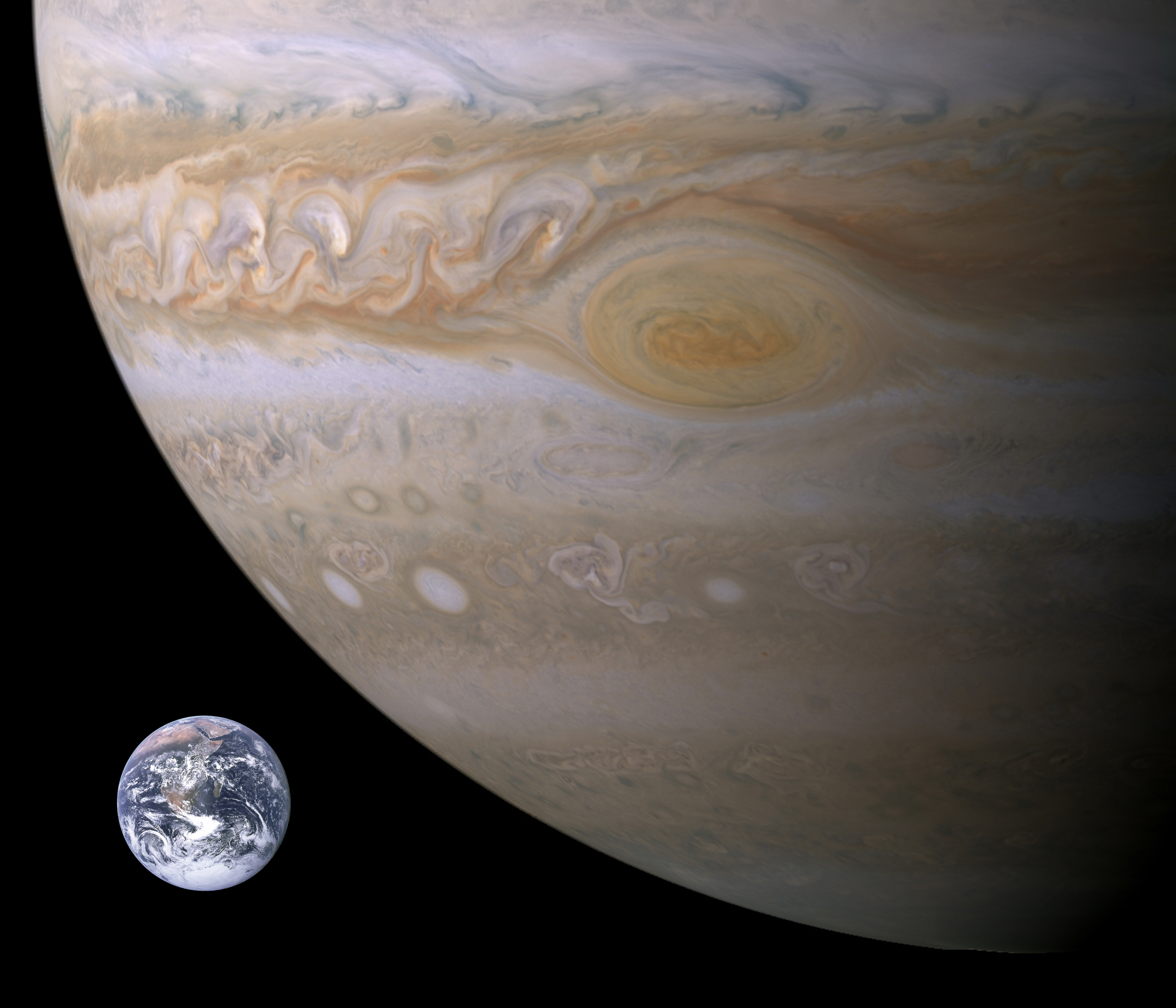
Size of the Earth compared to the Great Red Spot

Careful tracking of atmospheric features revealed the Great Red Spot's counterclockwise circulation as far back as 1966, observations dramatically confirmed by the first time-lapse movies from the Voyager fly-bys. The spot is confined by a modest eastward jet stream to its south and a very strong westward one to its north. Though winds around the edge of the spot peak at about 432 km/h (268 mph), currents inside it seem stagnant, with little inflow or outflow. The rotation of the spot has slowed with time, perhaps as a direct result of its steady reduction in size.

The Great Red Spot's latitude has been stable for the duration of good observational records, typically varying by about a degree. Its longitude, however, is subject to constant variation, including a 90-day longitudinal oscillation with an amplitude of ~1°. Because Jupiter's gaseous body does not rotate uniformly at all latitudes, astronomers have defined three different systems for defining longitude. System II is used for latitudes of more than 10 degrees and was originally based on the average rotational period of the Great Red Spot (9 h 55 min 42 s). Despite this, however, the spot has "lapped" the planet in System II at least 10 times since the early 19th century. Its drift rate has changed dramatically over the years and has been linked to the brightness of the South Equatorial Belt and the presence or absence of a South Tropical Disturbance.

== Internal depth and structure ==
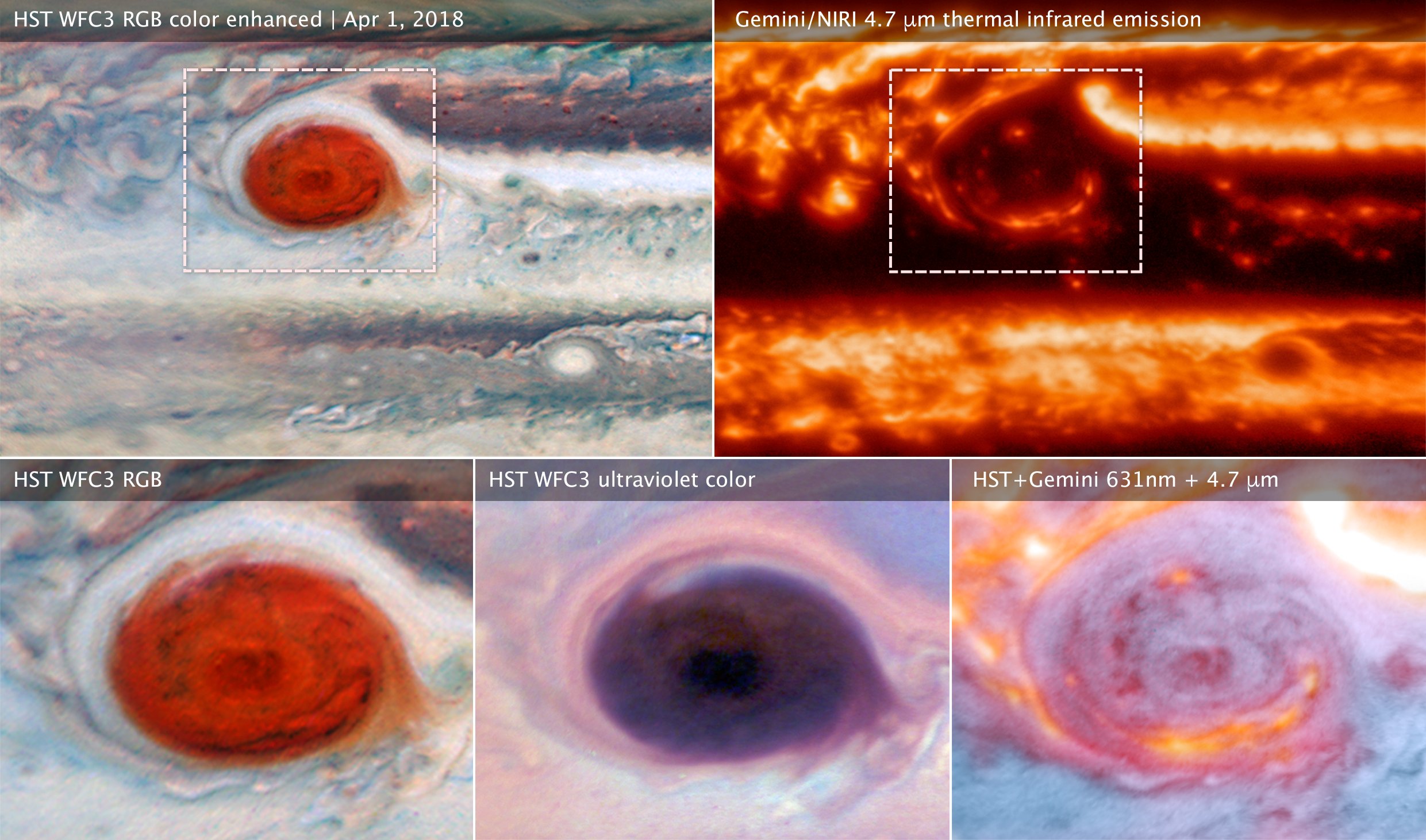
Clockwise from top left: Hubble image of visible spectrum; infrared from the Gemini Observatory; multiwavelength composite of Hubble and Gemini data showing visible light in blue and thermal infrared in red; ultraviolet image from Hubble; visible light detail

Jupiter's Great Red Spot (GRS) is an elliptical-shaped anticyclone, occurring at 22 degrees below the equator, in Jupiter's southern hemisphere. The largest anticyclonic storm (~16,000 km) in the Solar System, little is known about its internal depth and structure. Visible imaging and cloud-tracking from in-situ observation determined the velocity and vorticity of the GRS, which is located in a thin anticyclonic ring at 70–85% of the radius and is located along Jupiter's fastest westward moving jet stream. During NASA's 2016 Juno mission, gravity signature and thermal infrared data were obtained that offered insight into the structural dynamics and depth of the GRS. During July 2017, the Juno spacecraft conducted a second pass of the GRS to collect Microwave Radiometer (MWR) scans of the GRS to determine how far the GRS extended toward the surface of the condensed H_{2}O layer. These MWR scans suggested that the GRS vertical depth extended to about 240 km below cloud level, with an estimated drop in atmospheric pressure to 100 bar. Two methods of analysis that constrain the data collected were the mascon approach, which found a depth of ~290 km, and the Slepian approach showing wind extending to ~310 km. These methods, along with gravity signature MWR data, suggest that the GRS zonal winds still increase at a rate of 50% of the velocity of the viable cloud level, before the wind decay starts at lower levels. This rate of wind decay and gravity data suggest the depth of the GRS is between 200 and 500 km.

Galileo and Cassini's thermal infrared imaging and spectroscopy of the GRS were conducted during 1995–2008, in order to find evidence of thermal inhomogeneities within the internal structure vortex of the GRS. Previous thermal infrared temperature maps from the Voyager, Galileo, and Cassini missions suggested the GRS is a structure of an anticyclonic vortex with a cold core within a upwelling warmer annulus; this data shows a gradient in the temperature of the GRS. Better understanding of Jupiter's atmospheric temperature, aerosol particle opacity, and ammonia gas composition was provided by thermal-IR imaging: a direct correlation of the visible cloud layers reactions, thermal gradient and compositional mapping to observational data were collected over decades. During December 2000, high spatial resolution images from Galileo, of an atmospheric turbulent area to the northwest of the GRS, showed a thermal contrast between the warmest region of the anticyclone and regions to the east and west of the GRS.

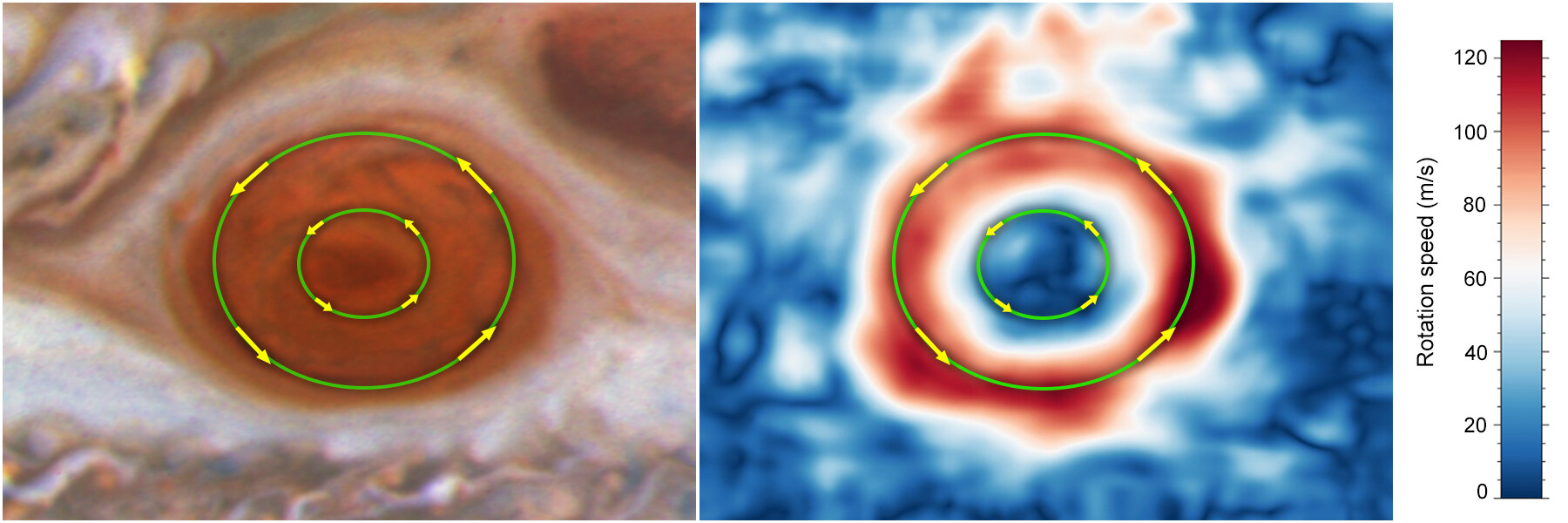
Winds in the Great Red Spot as analyzed from Hubble's data. In the false-color image at right, red indicates faster wind, blue indicates slower.

The vertical temperature of the structure of the GRS is constrained to be between 100 and 600 mbar, with the vertical temperature of the GRS core at approximately 400 mbar of pressure being 1.0–1.5 K, much warmer than regions of the GRS to the east–west, and 3.0–3.5 K warmer than regions to the north–south of the structure's edge. This structure is consistent with the data collected by the VISIR (VLT Mid-Infrared Imager Spectrometer on the ESO Very Large Telescope) imaging obtained in 2006; this revealed that the GRS was physically present at a wide range of altitudes that occur within the atmospheric pressure range of 80–600 mbar, and confirms the thermal infrared mapping result. To develop a model of the internal structure of the GRS, the Cassini instrument Composite Infrared Spectrometer (CIRS) and ground based spatial imaging mapped the composition of the phosphine and ammonia aerosols (PH_{3}, NH_{3}) and para-hydroxybenzoic acid within the anticyclonic circulation of the GRS. The images that were collected from the CIRS and ground-based imaging trace the vertical motion in the Jovian atmosphere by PH_{3} and NH_{3} spectra.

The highest concentrations of PH_{3} and NH_{3} were found to the north of the GRS peripheral rotation. They aided in determining the southward jet movement and showed evidence of an increase in altitude of the column of aerosols with pressures ranging from 200–500 mbar. However, the NH_{3} composition data shows that there is a major depletion of NH_{3} below the visible cloud layer at the southern peripheral ring of the GRS; this lower opacity is relative to a narrow band of atmospheric subsidence. The low mid-IR aerosol opacity, along with the temperature gradients, the altitude difference, and the vertical movement of the zonal winds, are involved with the development and sustainability of the vorticity. The stronger atmospheric subsidence and compositional asymmetries of the GRS suggest that the structure exhibits a degree of tilt from the northern edge to the southern edge of the structure. The GRS depth and internal structure has been constantly changing over decades; however there is still no logical reason that it is 200–500 km in depth, but the jet streams that supply the force that powers the GRS vortex are well below the structure base.

== Color and composition ==
It is not known what causes the Great Red Spot's reddish color. Hypotheses supported by laboratory experiments suppose that it may be caused by chemical products created by the solar ultraviolet irradiation of ammonium hydrosulfide and the organic compound acetylene, which produces a reddish material—likely complex organic compounds called tholins. The high altitude of the compounds may also contribute to the coloring.

The Great Red Spot varies greatly in hue, from almost brick-red to pale salmon or even white. The spot occasionally disappears, becoming evident only through the Red Spot Hollow, which is its location in the South Equatorial Belt (SEB). Its visibility is apparently coupled to the SEB: when the belt is bright white, the spot tends to be dark, and when it is dark, the spot is usually light. These periods when the spot is dark or light occur at irregular intervals: between 1947 and 1997, the spot was darkest in the periods 1961–1966, 1968–1975, 1989–1990, and 1992–1993.

== See also ==
- Extraterrestrial vortex
- Great Dark Spot, a similar storm on Neptune
- Great White Spot, a similar storm on Saturn
- Hypercane, a hypothetical type of very large storm on Earth
- WISEP J190648.47+401106.8, a brown dwarf observed to have a similar large storm
