= Exploration of Jupiter =

Overview of the exploration of the planet Jupiter and its moons

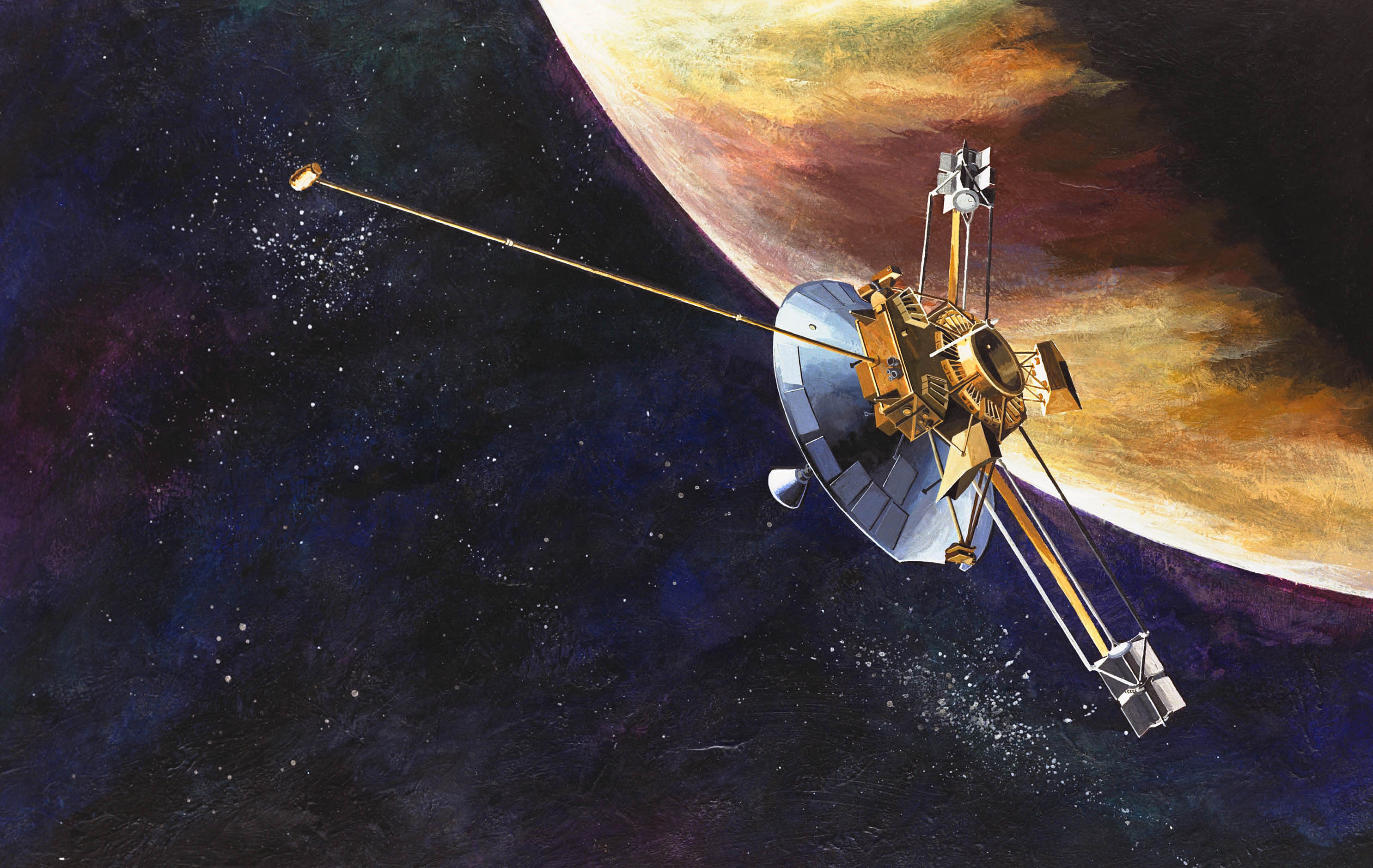
Artist's depiction of Pioneer 10, the first spacecraft to visit Jupiter

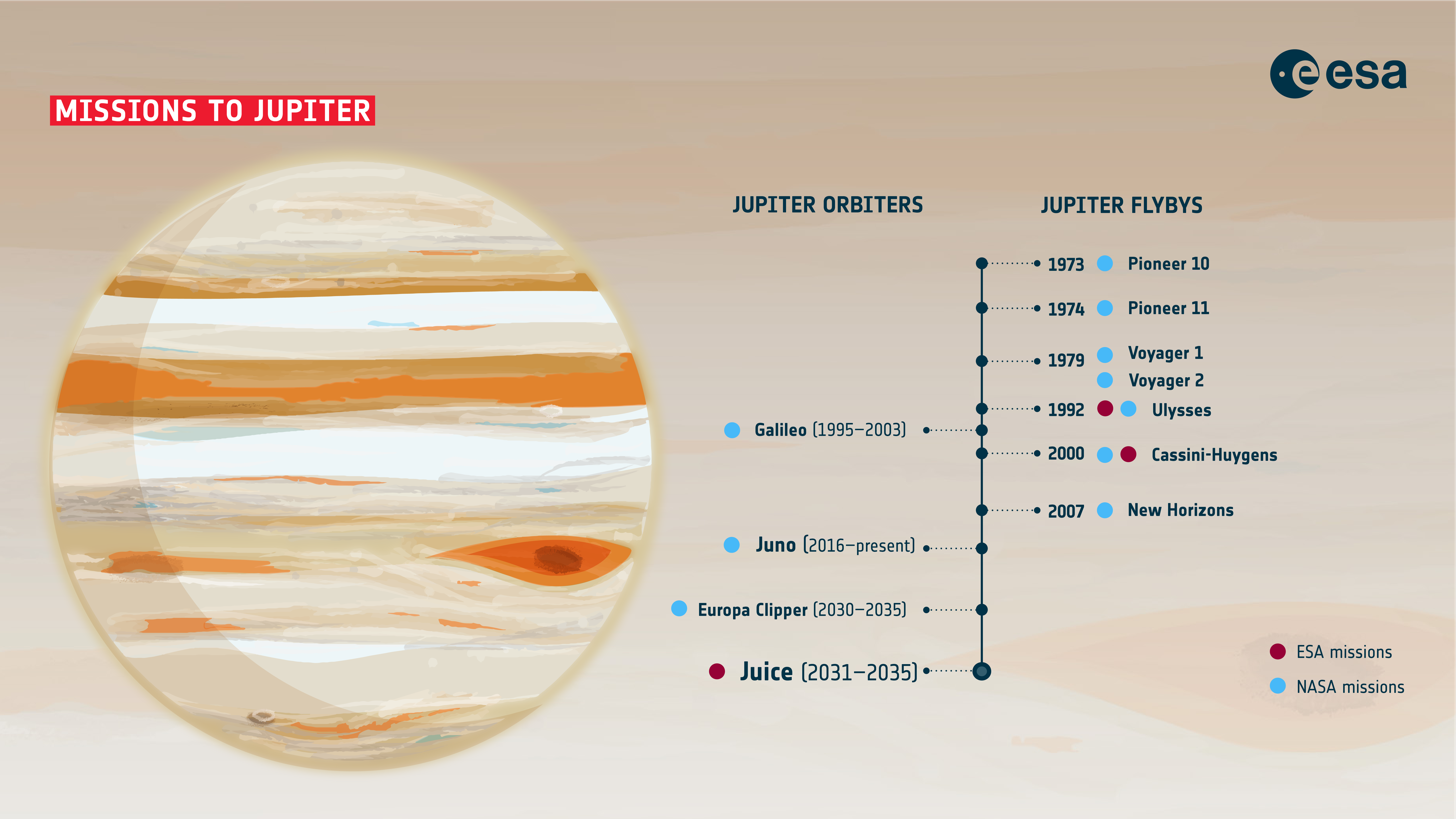
Past and ongoing missions to Jupiter

The exploration of Jupiter has been conducted via close observations by automated spacecraft. It began with the arrival of Pioneer 10 into the Jovian system in 1973, and, as of 2026, has continued with eight further spacecraft missions in the vicinity of Jupiter and two more en route. All but one of these missions were undertaken by the National Aeronautics and Space Administration (NASA), and all but four were flybys taking detailed observations without landing or entering orbit. These probes make Jupiter the most visited of the Solar System's outer planets as all missions to the outer Solar System have used Jupiter flybys. On July 5, 2016, spacecraft Juno arrived and entered the planet's orbit—the second craft ever to do so. Sending a craft to Jupiter is difficult due to large fuel requirements and the effects of the planet's harsh radiation environment.

The first spacecraft to visit Jupiter was Pioneer 10 in 1973, followed a year later by Pioneer 11. Aside from taking the first close-up pictures of the planet, the probes discovered its magnetosphere and its largely fluid interior. The Voyager 1 and Voyager 2 probes visited the planet in 1979, and studied its moons and the ring system, discovering the volcanic activity of Io and the presence of water ice on the surface of Europa. Ulysses, intended to observe the Sun's poles, further studied Jupiter's magnetosphere in 1992 and then again in 2004. The Saturn-bound Cassini probe approached the planet in 2000 and took very detailed images of its atmosphere. The Pluto-bound New Horizons spacecraft passed by Jupiter in 2007 and made improved measurements of its and its satellites' parameters.

The Galileo spacecraft was the first to have entered orbit around Jupiter, arriving in 1995 and studying the planet until 2003. During this period Galileo gathered a large amount of information about the Jovian system, making close approaches to all of the four large Galilean moons and finding evidence for thin atmospheres on three of them, as well as the possibility of liquid water beneath their surfaces. It also discovered a magnetic field around Ganymede. As it approached Jupiter, it also witnessed the impact of Comet Shoemaker–Levy 9. In December 1995, it sent an atmospheric probe into the Jovian atmosphere, so far the only craft to do so.

In July 2016, the Juno spacecraft, launched in 2011, completed its orbital insertion maneuver successfully, and is in orbit around Jupiter with its science programme ongoing, with goals to study its magnetosphere and atmosphere in depth.

The European Space Agency selected the L1-class JUICE orbiter mission in 2012 as part of its Cosmic Vision programme to explore three of Jupiter's Galilean moons, with a possible Ganymede lander provided by Roscosmos. JUICE was launched on April 14, 2023. The Russian lander did not materialize in the end.

NASA successfully launched another orbiter spacecraft, Europa Clipper, to study the moon Europa on October 14, 2024.

The Chinese National Space Administration planned to launch two Interstellar Express missions in 2024 on a flyby of Jupiter and Tianwen-4 around 2029 to explore the planet and Callisto.

== Technical requirements ==
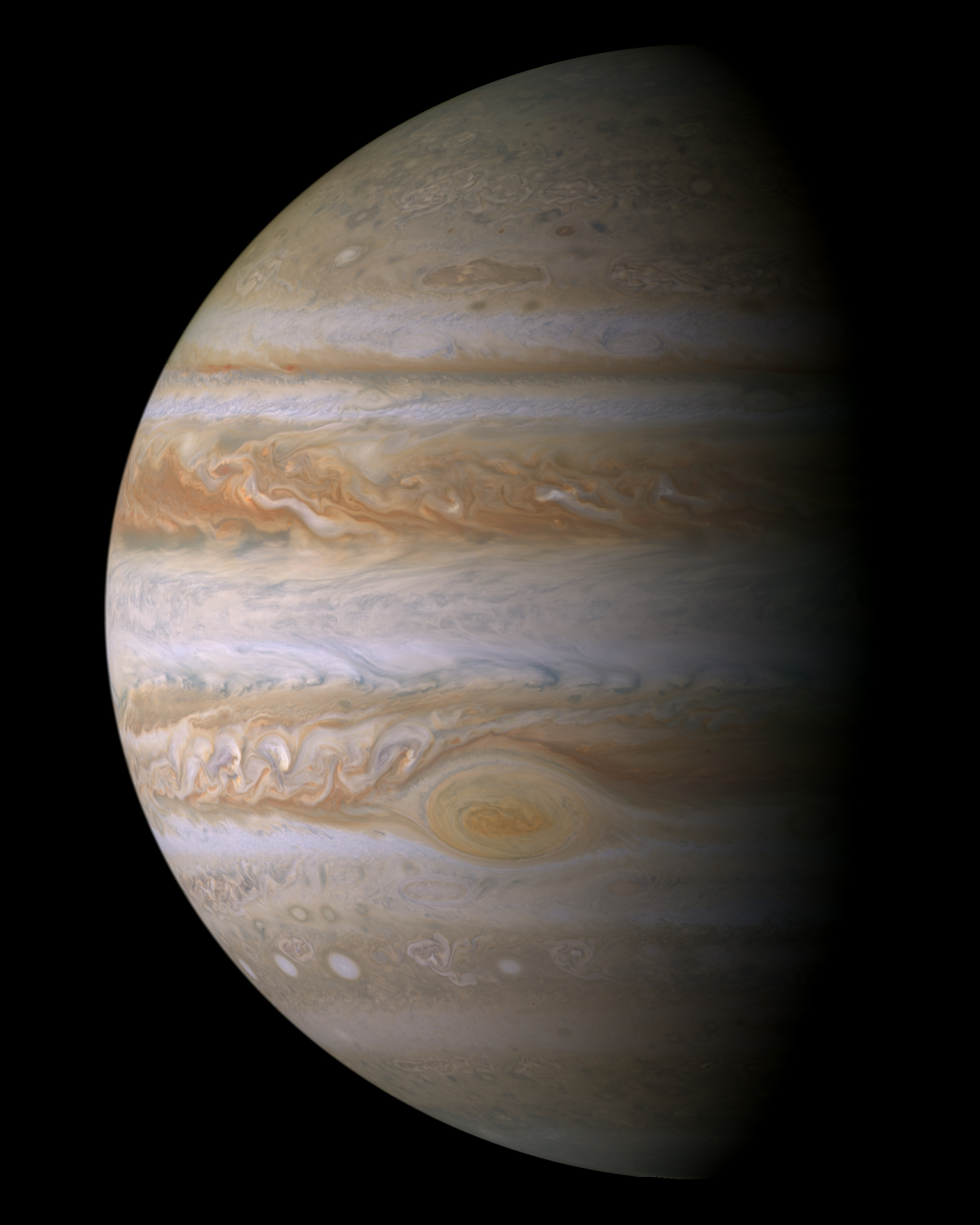
Jupiter as seen by the space probe Cassini

Flights from Earth to other planets in the Solar System have a high energy cost. It requires almost the same amount of energy for a spacecraft to reach Jupiter from Earth's orbit as it does to lift it into orbit in the first place. In astrodynamics, this energy expenditure is defined by the net change in the spacecraft's velocity, or delta-v. The energy needed to reach Jupiter from an Earth orbit requires a delta-v of about 9 km/s, compared to the 9.0–9.5 km/s to reach a low Earth orbit from the ground. Gravity assists through planetary flybys (such as by Earth or Venus) can be used to reduce the energetic requirement (i.e. the fuel) at launch, at the cost of a significantly longer flight duration to reach a target such as Jupiter when compared to the direct trajectory. Ion thrusters capable of a delta-v of more than 10 km/s were used on the Dawn spacecraft. This is more than enough delta-v to do a Jupiter fly-by mission from a solar orbit of the same radius as that of Earth without gravity assist.

Jupiter has no solid surface on which to land, as there is a smooth transition between the planet's atmosphere and its fluid interior. Any probes descending into the atmosphere are eventually crushed by the immense pressures within Jupiter.

A major issue with sending probes to Jupiter is the amount of radiation to which a space probe is subjected, due to the harsh charged-particle environment around Jupiter (for a detailed explanation see Magnetosphere of Jupiter). For example, when Pioneer 11 made its closest approach to the planet, the level of radiation was ten times more powerful than Pioneer's designers had predicted, leading to fears that the probes would not survive. With a few minor glitches, the probe managed to pass through the radiation belts, but it lost most of the images of the moon Io, as the radiation had caused Pioneer's imaging photo polarimeter to receive false commands. The subsequent and far more technologically advanced Voyager spacecraft had to be redesigned to cope with the radiation levels. Over the eight years the Galileo spacecraft orbited the planet, the probe's radiation dose far exceeded its design specifications, and its systems failed on several occasions. The spacecraft's gyroscopes often exhibited increased errors, and electrical arcs sometimes occurred between its rotating and non-rotating parts, causing it to enter safe mode, which led to total loss of the data from the 16th, 18th and 33rd orbits. The radiation also caused phase shifts in Galileo's ultra-stable quartz oscillator.

== Flyby missions ==
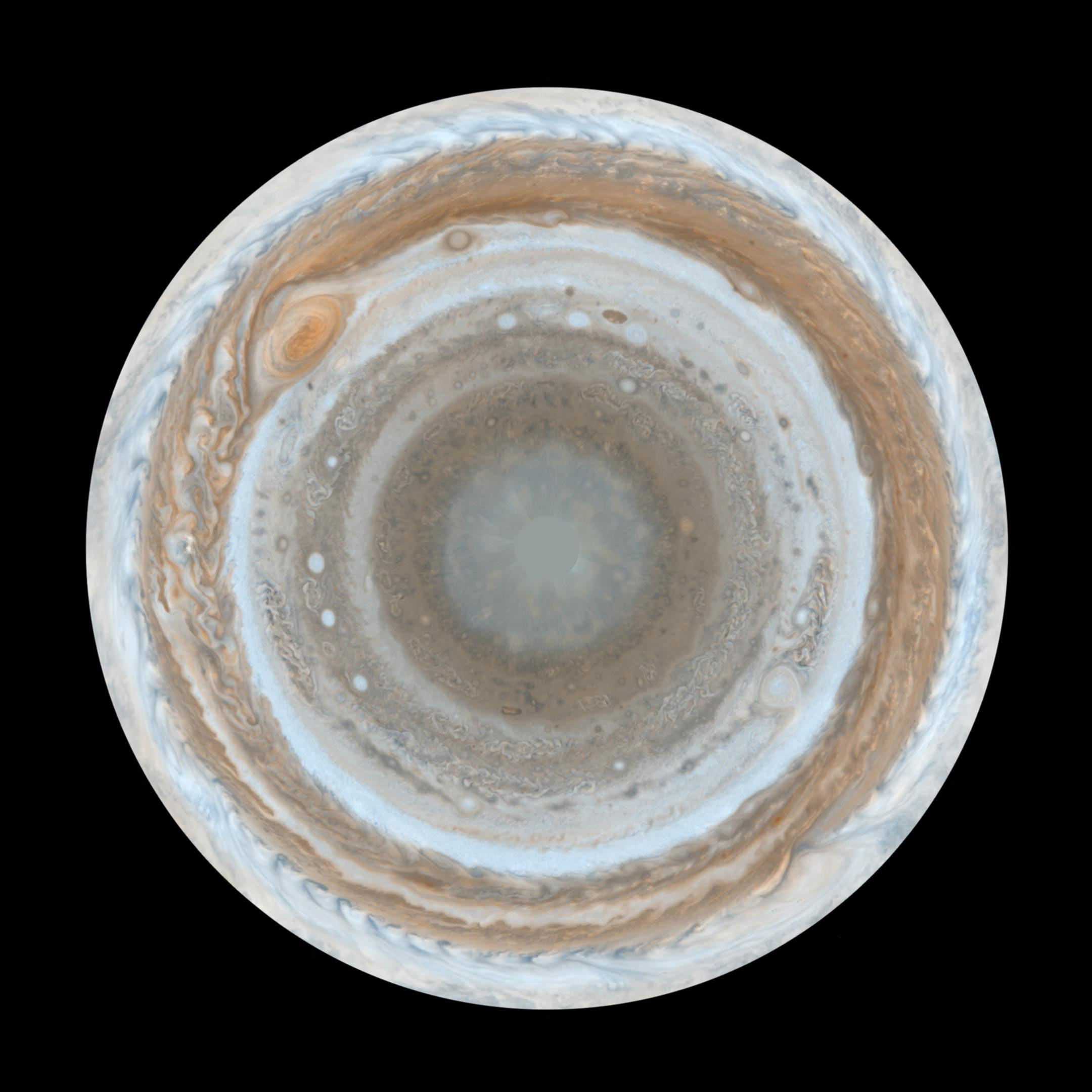
South pole (Cassini; 2000)

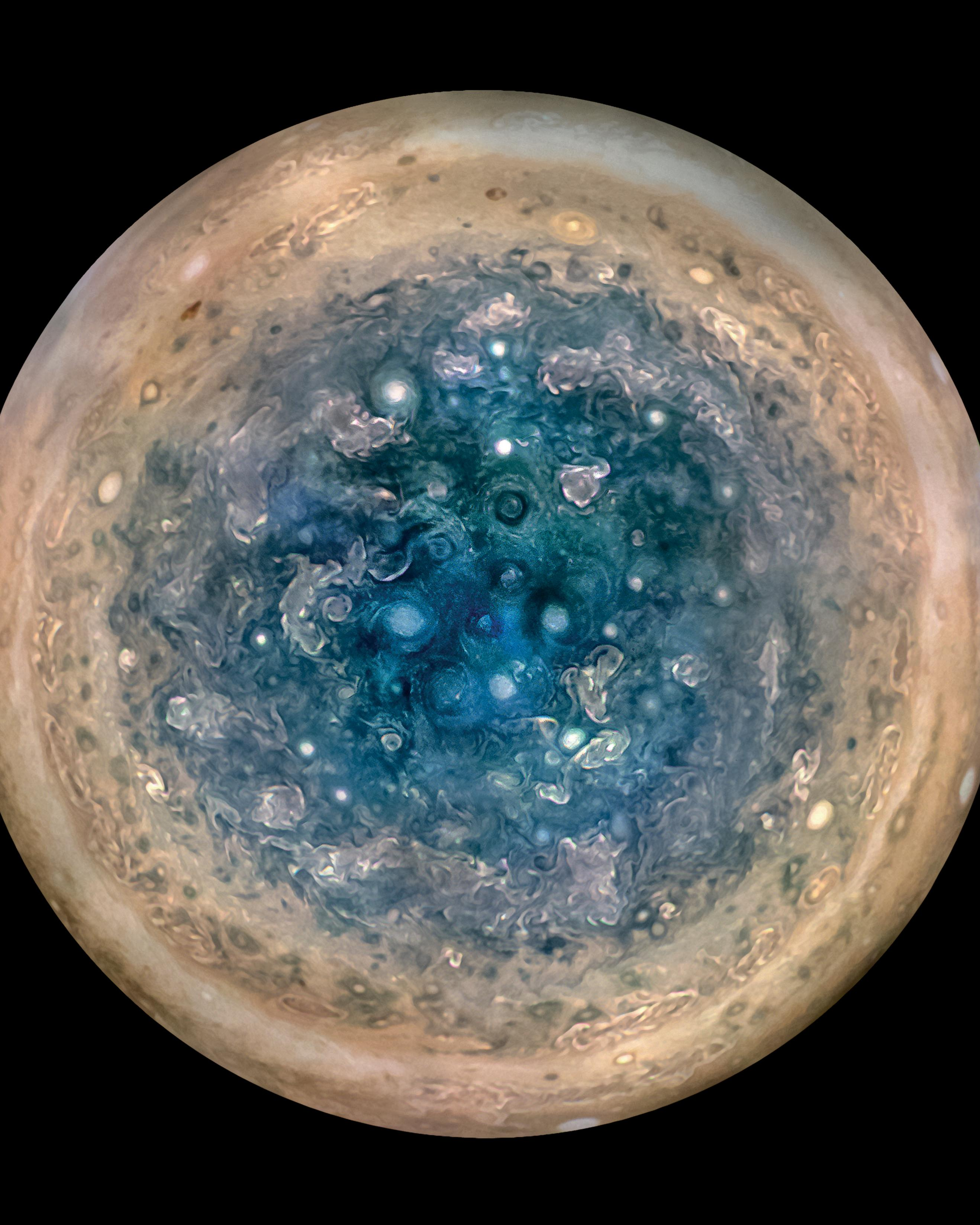
South pole (Juno; 2017)

=== Pioneer program (1973 and 1974) ===
Animation of Pioneer 11's trajectory around Jupiter from 30 November 1974 to 5 December 1974 Pioneer 11 · Jupiter · Io · Europa · Ganymede · Callisto

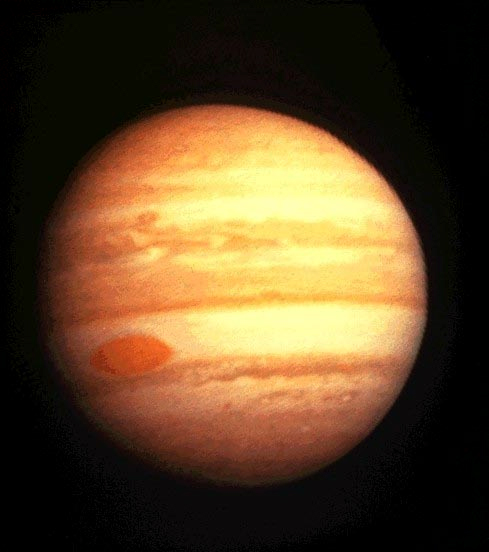
Jupiter as imaged by Pioneer 10, the first spacecraft to visit it

The first spacecraft to explore Jupiter was Pioneer 10, which flew past the planet in December 1973, followed by Pioneer 11 twelve months later. Pioneer 10 obtained the first close-up images of Jupiter and its Galilean moons; the spacecraft studied the planet's atmosphere, detected its magnetic field, observed its radiation belts and determined that Jupiter is mainly fluid. Pioneer 11 made its closest approach, within some 43,000 km of Jupiter's cloud tops, on December 3, 1974. It obtained dramatic images of the Great Red Spot, made the first observation of Jupiter's immense polar regions, and determined the mass of Jupiter's moon Callisto. The information gathered by these two spacecraft helped astronomers and engineers improve the design of future probes to cope more effectively with the environment around the giant planet.

=== Voyager program (1979) ===
Time-lapse sequence from the approach of Voyager 1 to Jupiter

Voyager 1 began photographing Jupiter in January 1979 and made its closest approach on March 5, 1979, at a distance of 349,000 km from Jupiter's center. This close approach allowed for greater image resolution, though the flyby's short duration meant that most observations of Jupiter's moons, rings, magnetic field, and radiation environment were made in the 48-hour period bracketing the approach, even though Voyager 1 continued photographing the planet until April. It was soon followed by Voyager 2, which made its closest approach on July 9, 1979, 576,000 km away from the planet's cloud tops. The probes discovered Jupiter's rings, observed intricate vortices in its atmosphere, observed active volcanoes on Io, a process analogous to plate tectonics on Ganymede, and numerous craters on Callisto.

The Voyager missions vastly improved our understanding of the Galilean moons, and also discovered Jupiter's rings. They also took the first close-up images of the planet's atmosphere, revealing the Great Red Spot as a complex storm moving in a counter-clockwise direction. Other smaller storms and eddies were found throughout the banded clouds (see animation on the right). Two new, small satellites, Adrastea and Metis, were discovered orbiting just outside the ring, making them the first of Jupiter's moons to be identified by a spacecraft. A third new satellite, Thebe, was discovered between the orbits of Amalthea and Io.

The discovery of volcanic activity on the moon Io was the greatest unexpected finding of the mission, as it was the first time an active volcano was observed on a celestial body other than Earth. Together, the Voyagers recorded the eruption of nine volcanoes on Io, as well as evidence for other eruptions occurring between the Voyager encounters.

Europa displayed a large number of intersecting linear features in the low-resolution photos from Voyager 1. At first, scientists believed the features might be deep cracks, caused by crustal rifting or tectonic processes. The high-resolution photos from Voyager 2, taken closer to Jupiter, left scientists puzzled as the features in these photos were almost entirely lacking in topographic relief. This led many to suggest that these cracks might be similar to ice floes on Earth, and that Europa might have a liquid water interior. Europa may be internally active due to tidal heating at a level about one-tenth that of Io, and as a result, the moon is thought to have a thin crust less than 30 kilometers (19 mi) thick of water ice, possibly floating on a 50-kilometer-deep (31 mi) ocean.

=== Ulysses (1992, 2004) ===
On February 8, 1992, the Ulysses solar probe flew past Jupiter's north pole at a distance of 451,000 km. This swing-by maneuver was required for Ulysses to attain a very high-inclination orbit around the Sun, increasing its inclination to the ecliptic to 80.2 degrees. The giant planet's gravity bent the spacecraft's flightpath downward and away from the ecliptic plane, placing it into a final orbit around the Sun's north and south poles. The size and shape of the probe's orbit were adjusted to a much smaller degree, so that its aphelion remained at approximately 5 AU (Jupiter's distance from the Sun), while its perihelion lay somewhat beyond 1 AU (Earth's distance from the Sun). During its Jupiter encounter, the probe made measurements of the planet's magnetosphere. Since the probe had no cameras, no images were taken. In February 2004, the probe arrived again at the vicinity of Jupiter. This time the distance from the planet was much greater—about 120 million km (0.8 AU)—but it made further observations of Jupiter.

=== Cassini (2000) ===
In 2000, the Cassini probe, en route to Saturn, flew by Jupiter and provided some of the highest-resolution images ever taken of the planet. It made its closest approach on December 30, 2000, and made many scientific measurements. About 26,000 images of Jupiter were taken during the months-long flyby. It produced the most detailed global color portrait of Jupiter yet, in which the smallest visible features are approximately 60 km (37 mi) across.

A major finding of the flyby, announced on March 5, 2003, was of Jupiter's atmospheric circulation. Dark belts alternate with light zones in the atmosphere, and the zones, with their pale clouds, had previously been considered by scientists to be areas of upwelling air, partly because on Earth clouds tend to be formed by rising air. Analysis of Cassini imagery showed that the dark belts contain individual storm cells of upwelling bright-white clouds, too small to see from Earth. Anthony Del Genio of NASA's Goddard Institute for Space Studies said that "the belts must be the areas of net-rising atmospheric motion on Jupiter, [so] the net motion in the zones has to be sinking".

Other atmospheric observations included a swirling dark oval of high atmospheric-haze, about the size of the Great Red Spot, near Jupiter's north pole. Infrared imagery revealed aspects of circulation near the poles, with bands of globe-encircling winds, and adjacent bands moving in opposite directions. The same announcement also discussed the nature of Jupiter's rings. Light scattering by particles in the rings showed the particles were irregularly shaped (rather than spherical) and likely originated as ejecta from micrometeorite impacts on Jupiter's moons, probably on Metis and Adrastea. On December 19, 2000, the Cassini spacecraft captured a very-low-resolution image of the moon Himalia, but it was too distant to show any surface details.

=== New Horizons (2007) ===
Video of volcanic plumes on Io, as recorded by New Horizons in 2008

The New Horizons probe, en route to Pluto, flew by Jupiter for a gravity assist and was the first probe launched directly towards Jupiter since the Ulysses in 1990. Its Long Range Reconnaissance Imager (LORRI) took its first photographs of Jupiter on September 4, 2006. The spacecraft began further study of the Jovian system in December 2006, and made its closest approach on February 28, 2007.

Although close to Jupiter, New Horizons' instruments made refined measurements of the orbits of Jupiter's inner moons, particularly Amalthea. The probe's cameras measured volcanoes on Io, studied all four Galilean moons in detail, and made long-distance studies of the outer moons Himalia and Elara. The craft also studied Jupiter's Little Red Spot and the planet's magnetosphere and tenuous ring system.

On March 19, 2007, the Command and Data Handling computer experienced an uncorrectable memory error and rebooted itself, causing the spacecraft to go into safe mode. The craft fully recovered within two days, with some data loss on Jupiter's magnetotail. No other data loss events were associated with the encounter.

== Orbiter missions ==
=== Galileo (1995–2003) ===
Animation of Galileo's trajectory around Jupiter from 1 August 1995 to 30 September 2003 Galileo · Jupiter · Io · Europa · Ganymede · Callisto

The first spacecraft to orbit Jupiter was the Galileo orbiter, which went into orbit around Jupiter on December 7, 1995. It orbited the planet for over seven years, making 35 orbits before it was destroyed during a controlled impact with Jupiter on September 21, 2003. During this period, it gathered a large amount of information about the Jovian system; the amount of information was not as great as intended because the deployment of its high-gain radio transmitting antenna failed. The major events during the eight-year study included multiple flybys of all of the Galilean moons, as well as Amalthea (the first probe to do so). It also witnessed the impact of Comet Shoemaker–Levy 9 as it approached Jupiter in 1994 and released an atmospheric probe into the Jovian atmosphere in December 1995.

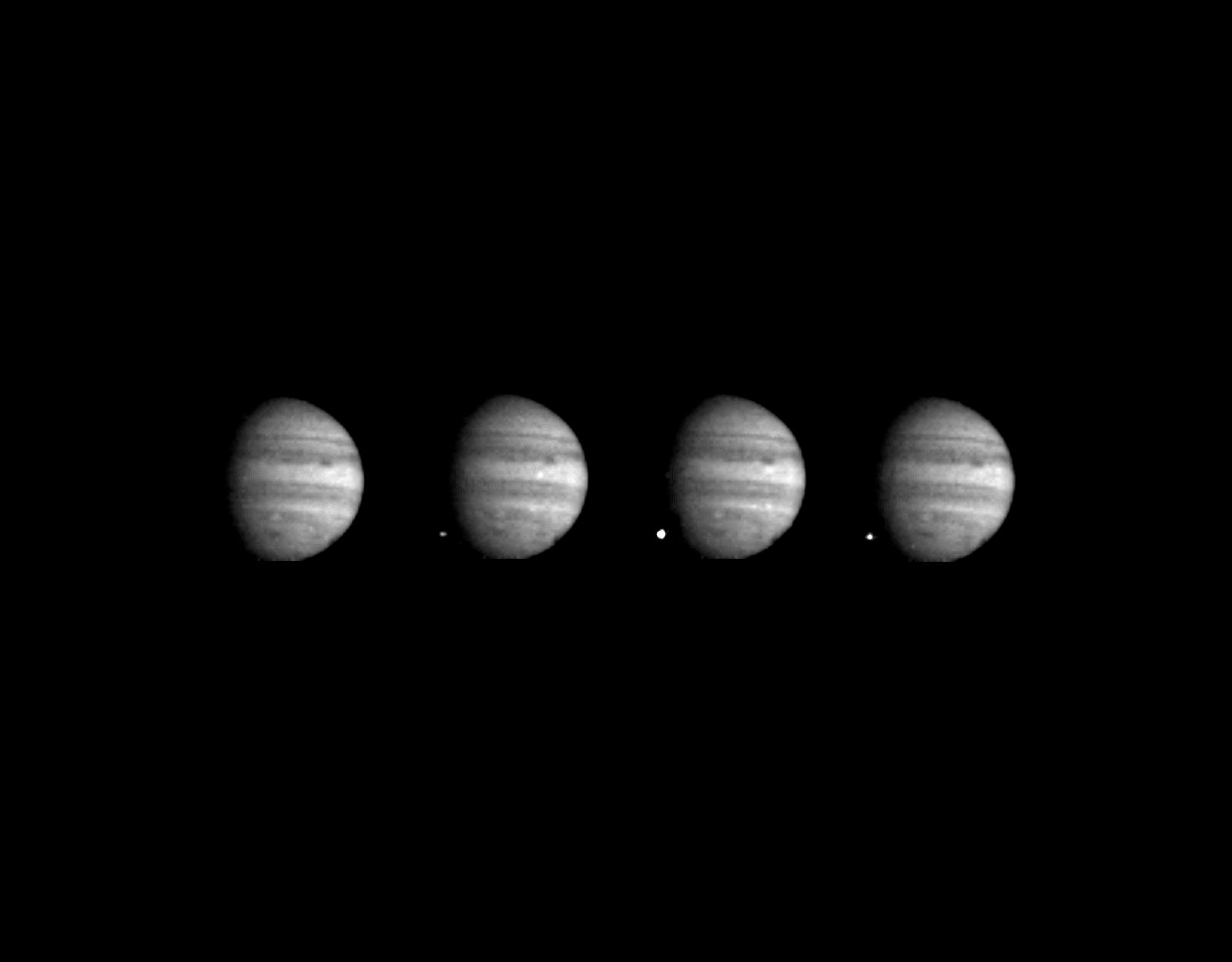
A sequence of Galileo images taken several seconds apart shows the appearance of the fireball appearing on the dark side of Jupiter from one of the fragments of Comet Shoemaker–Levy 9 hitting the planet.

Cameras on the Galileo spacecraft observed fragments of Comet Shoemaker–Levy 9 between 16 and 22 July 1994 as they collided with Jupiter's southern hemisphere at a speed of approximately 60 kilometres per second. This was the first direct observation of an extraterrestrial collision of Solar System objects. While the impacts took place on the side of Jupiter hidden from Earth, Galileo, then at a distance of 1.6 AU from the planet, was able to see the impacts as they occurred. Its instruments detected a fireball that reached a peak temperature of about 24,000 K, compared to the typical Jovian cloudtop temperature of about 130 K (−143 °C), with the plume from the fireball reaching a height of over 3,000 km.

An atmospheric probe was released from the spacecraft in July 1995, entering the planet's atmosphere on December 7, 1995. After a high-g descent into the Jovian atmosphere, the probe discarded the remains of its heat shield, and it parachuted through 150 km of the atmosphere, collecting data for 57.6 minutes, before being crushed by the pressure and temperature to which it was subjected (about 22 times Earth normal, at a temperature of 153 °C). It would have melted thereafter, and possibly vaporized. The Galileo orbiter itself experienced a more rapid version of the same fate when it was deliberately steered into the planet on September 21, 2003, at a speed of over 50 km/s, in order to avoid any possibility of it crashing into and contaminating Europa.

Major scientific results of the Galileo mission include:

- the first observation of ammonia clouds in another planet's atmosphere—the atmosphere creates ammonia ice particles from material coming up from lower depths;
- confirmation of extensive volcanic activity on Io—which is 100 times greater than that found on Earth; the heat and frequency of eruptions are reminiscent of early Earth;
- observation of complex plasma interactions in Io's atmosphere which create immense electrical currents that couple to Jupiter's atmosphere;
- providing evidence for supporting the theory that liquid oceans exist under Europa's icy surface;
- first detection of a substantial magnetic field around a satellite (Ganymede);
- magnetic data evidence suggesting that Europa, Ganymede and Callisto have a liquid-saltwater layer under the visible surface;
- evidence for a thin atmospheric layer on Europa, Ganymede, and Callisto known as a 'surface-bound exosphere';
- understanding of the formation of the rings of Jupiter (by dust kicked up as interplanetary meteoroids which smash into the planet's four small inner moons) and observation of two outer rings and the possibility of a separate ring along Amalthea's orbit;
- identification of the global structure and dynamics of a giant planet's magnetosphere.

On December 11, 2013, NASA reported, based on results from the Galileo mission, the detection of "clay-like minerals" (specifically, phyllosilicates), often associated with organic materials, on the icy crust of Europa, moon of Jupiter. The presence of the minerals may have been the result of a collision with an asteroid or comet according to the scientists.

=== Juno (since 2016) ===
Animation of Juno's trajectory around Jupiter from 1 June 2016 to 1 October 2028 Juno · Jupiter

NASA launched Juno on August 5, 2011, to study Jupiter in detail. It entered a polar orbit of Jupiter on July 5, 2016. The spacecraft is studying the planet's composition, gravity field, magnetic field, and polar magnetosphere. Juno is also searching for clues about how Jupiter formed, including whether the planet has a rocky core, the amount of water present within the deep atmosphere, and how the mass is distributed within the planet. Juno also studies Jupiter's deep winds, which can reach speeds of 600 km/h. As of August 2026, Juno has completed 86 orbits around Jupiter.

Among early results, Juno gathered information about Jovian lightning that revised earlier theories. Juno provided the first views of Jupiter's north pole, as well as insights about Jupiter's aurorae, magnetic field, and atmosphere.

In 2021, analysis of the frequency of interplanetary dust impacts (primarily on the backs of the solar panels), as Juno passed between Earth and the asteroid belt, indicated that this dust, which causes the Zodiacal light, comes from Mars, rather than from comets or asteroids that come from the outer solar system, as was previously thought.

Juno made many discoveries that are challenging existing theories about Jupiter's formation. When it flew over the poles of Jupiter it imaged clusters of stable cyclones that exist at the poles. It found that the magnetosphere of Jupiter is uneven and chaotic. Using its Microwave Radiometer Juno found that the red and white bands that can be seen on Jupiter extend hundreds of kilometers into the Jovian atmosphere, yet the interior of Jupiter isn't evenly mixed. This has resulted in the theory that Jupiter doesn't have a solid core as previously thought, but a "fuzzy" core made of pieces of rock and metallic hydrogen. This peculiar core may be a result of a collision that happened early on in Jupiter's formation.

In April 2020, Juno detected a meteor impact on Jupiter, with estimated mass of 250–5000 kg.

Results from Juno on storms suggests that they are far taller than expected, with some extending 60 miles (100 kilometers) below the cloud tops and others, including the Great Red Spot, extending over 200 miles (350 kilometers). With Juno traveling low over Jupiter's cloud deck at about 130,000 mph (209,000 kph) Juno scientists were able to measure velocity changes as small as 0.01 millimeter per second using a NASA's Deep Space Network tracking antenna, from a distance of more than 400 million miles (650 million kilometers). This enabled the team to constrain the depth of the Great Red Spot to about 300 miles (500 kilometers) below the cloud tops. The new results show that the cyclones are warmer on top, with lower atmospheric densities, while they are colder at the bottom, with higher densities. Anticyclones, which rotate in the opposite direction, are colder at the top but warmer at the bottom.

=== Jupiter Icy Moons Explorer (en route) ===
ESA's Jupiter Icy Moons Explorer (JUICE) has been selected as part of ESA's Cosmic Vision science program. It was launched on 14 April 2023 and, after a series of flybys in the inner Solar System, arrives in Jupiter in 2031. In 2012, the European Space Agency's selected the JUICE as its first Large mission, replacing its contribution to EJSM, the Jupiter Ganymede Orbiter (JGO). The partnership for the Europa Jupiter System Mission has since ended, but NASA will continue to contribute the European mission with hardware and an instrument.

=== Europa Clipper (en route) ===
The Europa Clipper is a NASA mission that will focus on studying Jupiter's moon Europa. It was launched on 14 October 2024, and will enter Jovian orbit after a 5.5-year cruise and gravity assists by Mars and Earth. The spacecraft would fly by Europa at least an intended 49 times to minimize radiation damage.

== Proposed missions ==
China's CNSA is planning to launch its two Shensuo (formerly Interstellar Express) spacecraft in 2026 to flyby Jupiter on the way to explore the heliosphere. Separately, CNSA has announced plans to launch its Tianwen-4 mission to Jupiter around 2030 which will enter orbit around Callisto. In addition, they plan to launch the Solar Polar Orbit Observatory towards Jupiter as a gravity assist, performing a similar mission to Ulysses in order to get into a high-inclination solar orbit.

India's ISRO announced plans to launch an Indian mission to Jupiter in the 2020s.

=== Cancelled missions ===
Because of the possibility of subsurface liquid oceans on Jupiter's moons Europa, Ganymede and Callisto, there has been great interest in studying the icy moons in detail. Funding difficulties have delayed progress. The Europa Orbiter was a planned NASA mission to Europa, which was cancelled in 2002. Its main objectives included determining the presence or absence of a subsurface ocean and identifying candidate sites for future lander missions. NASA's JIMO (Jupiter Icy Moons Orbiter), which was cancelled in 2005, and a European Jovian Europa Orbiter mission were also studied, but were superseded by the Europa Jupiter System Mission.

The Europa Jupiter System Mission (EJSM) was a joint NASA/ESA proposal for exploration of Jupiter and its moons. In February 2009 it was announced that both space agencies had given this mission priority ahead of the Titan Saturn System Mission. The proposal included a launch date of around 2020 and consisted of the NASA-led Jupiter Europa Orbiter, and the ESA-led Jupiter Ganymede Orbiter. ESA's contribution had encountered funding competition from other ESA projects. However, the Jupiter Europa Orbiter (JEO), NASA's contribution, was considered by the Planetary Decadal Survey to be too expensive. The survey supported a cheaper alternative to JEO. In the end, the whole EJSM mission, with all the proposed spacecraft from NASA and ESA (and JAXA), was cancelled (along with various related Roscosmos proposals). However, the ESA JUICE spacecraft and the NASA Europa Clipper spacecraft, which grew out of the cancelled EJSM, were built later.

== Human exploration ==
Jupiter's Galilean moons provide the potential opportunity for future human exploration. In 2003, NASA proposed a program called Human Outer Planets Exploration (HOPE) that involved sending astronauts to explore the Galilean moons. NASA has projected a possible attempt some time in the 2040s. In the Vision for Space Exploration policy announced in January 2004, NASA discussed missions beyond Mars, mentioning that a "human research presence" may be desirable on Jupiter's moons. Before the JIMO mission was cancelled, NASA administrator Sean O'Keefe stated that "human explorers will follow."

The Jovian system in general poses particular disadvantages for human missions because of the severe radiation conditions prevailing in Jupiter's magnetosphere.

Jovian radiation
Moon	rem/day
Io	3600
Europa	540
Ganymede	8
Callisto	0.01
Earth (Max)	0.07
Earth (Avg)	0.0007

Jupiter would deliver about 36 Sv (3600 rem) per day to unshielded astronauts at Io and about 5.4 Sv (540 rems) per day to unshielded astronauts at Europa, which is a decisive aspect because already an exposure to about 0.75 Sv over a period of a few days is enough to cause radiation poisoning, and about 5 Sv over a few days is lethal. In 1997, the Artemis Project designed a plan to fly humans to Europa. According to this plan, explorers would drill down into the Europan ice crust, entering the postulated subsurface ocean, where they would inhabit artificial air pockets.

Ganymede is the Solar System's largest moon and the Solar System's only known moon with a magnetosphere, but this does not shield it from cosmic radiation to a noteworthy degree, because it is overshadowed by Jupiter's magnetic field. Ganymede receives about 0.08 Sv (8 rem) of radiation per day. Callisto is farther from Jupiter's strong radiation belt and subject to only 0.0001 Sv (0.01 rem) a day. For comparison, the average amount of radiation taken on Earth by a living organism is about 0.0024 Sv per year; the highest natural radiation levels on Earth are recorded around Ramsar hot springs at about 0.26 Sv per year.

One of the main targets chosen by the HOPE study was Callisto. The possibility of building a surface base on Callisto was proposed, because of the low radiation levels at its distance from Jupiter and its geological stability. Callisto is the only Galilean satellite on which a crewed base is feasible. The levels of ionizing radiation on Io, Europa and long-term on Ganymede, are hostile to human life, and adequate protective measures have yet to be devised.

== Potential resource extraction ==
NASA has speculated on the feasibility of mining the atmospheres of the outer planets, particularly for helium-3, an isotope of helium that is rare on Earth and could have a very high value per unit mass as thermonuclear fuel. Factories stationed in orbit could mine the gas and deliver it to visiting craft.

== See also ==
- Exploration of Mercury
- Exploration of Venus
- Exploration of Mars
- Exploration of Saturn
- Exploration of Uranus
- Exploration of Neptune
