= JEO =

JEO may refer to:

- Jack Edward Oliver (1942–2007), British cartoonist
- Jovian Europa Orbiter, an ESA feasibility study
- Jupiter Europa Orbiter, a proposed NASA orbiter probe
- Justices examination order
