= Europa Orbiter =

Cancelled NASA orbiter mission to Europa

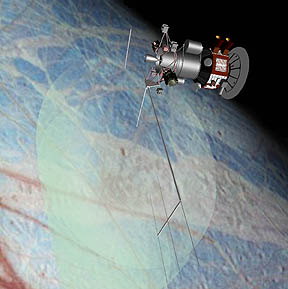
- An artist's impression of NASA's Europa Orbiter above the surface of Jupiter's moon, Europa
- Mission type: Europa orbiter
- Operator: NASA
- Mission duration: Cancelled

Spacecraft properties
- Launch mass: 900 kg (2,000 lb)

Start of mission
- Launch date: 2003
- Rocket: Space Shuttle

Europa orbiter
- Orbital insertion: 2007 (proposed)
- Large Strategic Science Missions; Planetary Science Division

The Europa Orbiter was a planned NASA mission to Jupiter's moon Europa, that was cancelled in 2002. Its main objectives included determining the presence or absence of a subsurface ocean and identifying candidate sites for future lander missions. Europa Orbiter received pre-project funding in 1998, and resulted from NASA's Fire and Ice project.

== History ==
Europa Orbiter was a design for a mission to the Jovian moon Europa, based on a 900 kg (2,000 lb) orbiter, of which 500 kg (1,100 lb) was fuel for maneuvers. It would have been powered by radioisotope thermoelectric generator (RTG) power and launched from the Space Shuttle in 2003. This would have meant an arrival at Jupiter in 2007, at which time it would commence in a three-part science tour focused on Europa. The spacecraft would be radiation hardened to survive a predicted 4 megarads of radiation.

The science payload would include a radar to determine the thickness of ice at Europa, and determine what was below it. Other instruments would be an altimeter and imaging systems, among other devices.

In 1999, NASA issued an announcement of opportunity that solicited experiments for Europa Orbiter, Pluto Kuiper Express, and Parker Solar Probe.

The results of the studies on the Europa Orbiter have been conducive to the Jupiter Europa Orbiter (JEO), NASA's contribution to the planned international Europa Jupiter System Mission (EJSM) that was slated for launch in 2020. EJSM was cancelled in 2011.

The Europa Orbiter-concept should not be confused with the Jovian Europa Orbiter, a feasibility study conducted by the European Space Agency (ESA) which was finally superseded by the EJSM, too.

Another Europa mission in this era was the Europa Ice Clipper, a Stardust mission-like sample return mission.

The next NASA mission to Jupiter was Juno, which was selected in 2005 as the next New Frontiers mission after New Horizons. It was launched in 2011 and arrived at Jupiter in the summer of 2016.

A 2002 paper noted the following challenges for this mission: "substantial energy required for a direct trajectory, the long duration of the mission, the high total-radiation dose, and the need for radioisotope thermoelectric generators". One mission plan involved first entering Jovian orbit, then use multiple gravity assists from the Moons of Jupiter to help it to enter the orbit of Europa with less rocket fuel.

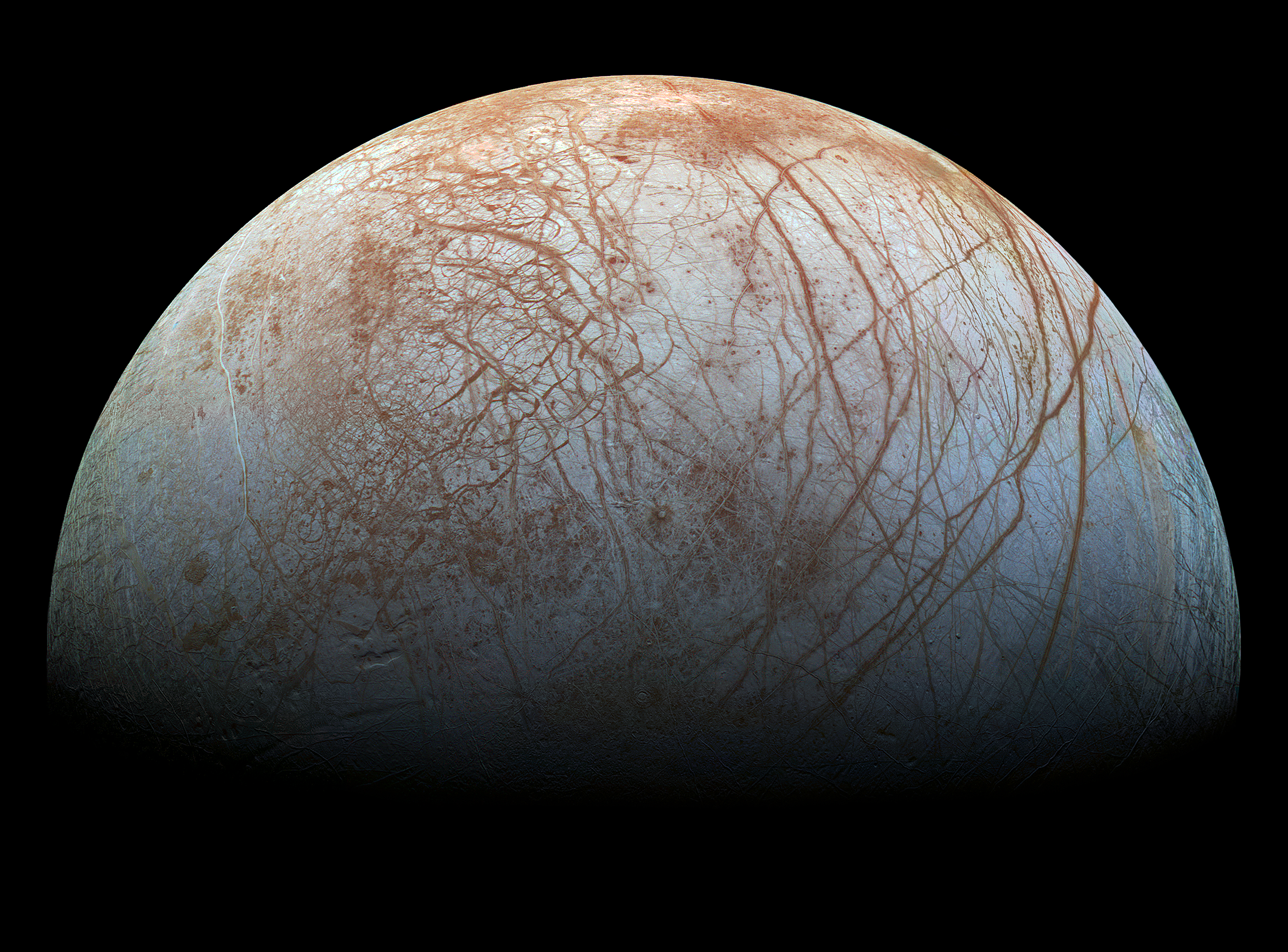
Europa's anti-Jovian hemisphere showing numerous lineae.

== Legacy ==
Later in the 21st century, it was suggested the goal of the Europa Orbiter should have been to find places where the freshest sub-surface material had been brought to the surface. This location would then be the target of a lander which could study what would hopefully be subsurface material, without having to drill down through the ice layer.

Another aspect that has been noted was that this concept was studied about three years leading up to its cancellation in 2002. After Europa Orbiter, NASA turned its attention to a nuclear fission powered orbiter for Europa for Project Prometheus.

== Comparison ==
Comparison of notional NASA missions targeting Jupiter's moon Europa.

Mission concepts
Name	Time Period	Power	Launcher
Europa Orbiter	1999–2002	RTG	Space Shuttle
Jupiter Icy Moons Orbiter	2004–2005	Fission	Delta IV Heavy
Jupiter Europa Orbiter (EJSM )	2008–2011	RTG	Delta IV Heavy, Atlas V, etc.
Europa Clipper	2015–	Solar	Falcon Heavy

== See also ==
- List of NASA cancellations
- Europa Clipper – NASA space mission to Jupiter and Europa
- Jupiter Europa Orbiter – Cancelled NASA mission concept to Europa
- Europa Lander (NASA) – Cancelled NASA lander for Europa
