= Ganymede (moon) =

Largest moon of Jupiter

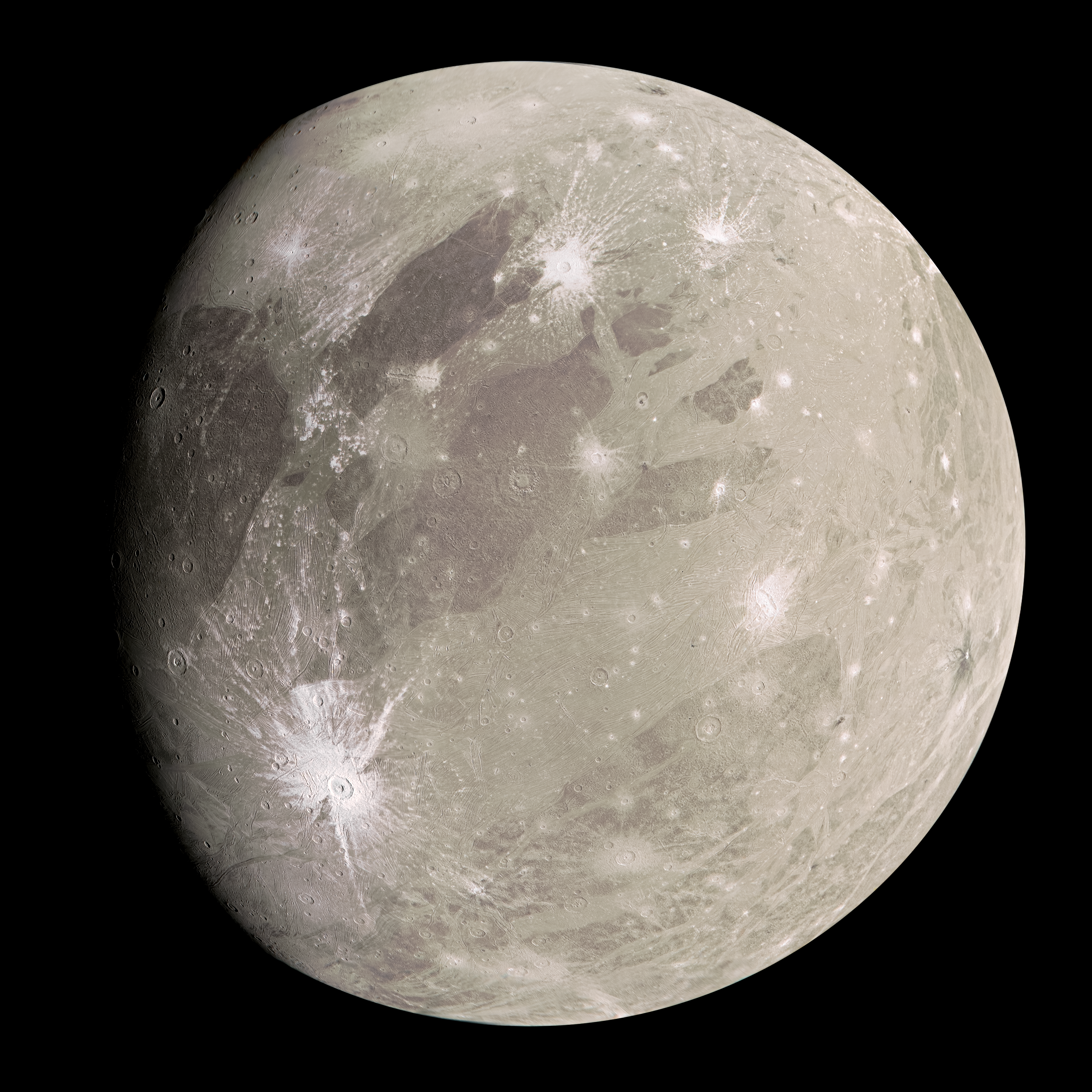
- Ganymede in true color as imaged by the Juno spacecraft in June 2021 (Note: The bright ray crater on the lower left near the terminator of Ganymede is the crater Tros)

Discovery
- Discovered by: Galileo Galilei; Simon Marius
- Discovery date: January 7, 1610

Designations
- Pronunciation: /ˈɡænɪmiːd/ GAN-im-eed
- Named after: Γανυμήδης, Ganymēdēs
- Alternative names: Jupiter III
- Adjectives: Ganymedian, Ganymedean (/ˌɡænəˈmiːdi.ən/)

Orbital characteristics
- Periapsis: 1069200 km (Note: Periapsis is derived from the semimajor axis (a) and eccentricity (e): $a\cdot(1-e)$.)
- Apoapsis: 1071600 km (Note: Apoapsis is derived from the semimajor axis (a) and eccentricity (e): $a\cdot(1+e)$.)
- Semi-major axis: 1070400 km
- Eccentricity: 0.0013
- Orbital period (sidereal): 7.15455296 d
- Average orbital speed: 10.880 km/s
- Inclination: 2.214° (to the ecliptic); 0.18° (to Jupiter's equator)
- Satellite of: Jupiter

Physical characteristics
- Dimensions: 5271.48 × 5264.76 × 5258.56 km
- Mean radius: 2632.27±0.1 km (0.413 Earths)
- Surface area: (8.7070±0.0007)×10^{7} km^{2} (0.171 Earths) (Note: Surface area derived from the radius (r): $4\pi r^2$.)
- Volume: (7.6398±0.0009)×10^{10} km^{3} (0.0704 Earths) (Note: Volume derived from the radius (r): $4\pi r^3/3$.)
- Mass: (1.48148±0.00003)×10^{23} kg (Note: Calculated from its standard gravitational parameter GM = 9887.83±0.03 km^{3}/s^{2}.) (0.025 Earths)
- Mean density: 1.9420±0.0048 g/cm^{3} (0.351 Earths)
- Surface gravity: 1.427 m/s^{2} (0.146 g) (Note: Surface gravity derived from the mass (m), the gravitational constant (G) and the radius (r): $Gm/r^2$.)
- Moment of inertia factor: 0.3161±0.00040
- Escape velocity: 2.741 km/s (Note: Escape velocity derived from the mass (m), the gravitational constant (G) and the radius (r): $\textstyle\sqrt{2Gm/r}$.)
- Synodic rotation period: synchronous
- Axial tilt: <0.1° (to orbit)
- Albedo: 0.46–0.43 (± 0.05) (geometric) (Note: For the leading and trailing hemispheres respectively.); 0.35±0.03 (Bond)
Surface temp.	min	mean	max
K	70	110	152
°C	−203	−163	−121
- Apparent magnitude: 4.61 (opposition); 4.38 (in 1951)
- Angular diameter: 1.2 to 1.8 arcseconds

Atmosphere
- Surface pressure: 0.2–1.2 μPa (1.97×10^{−12}–1.18×10^{−11} atm)
- Composition by volume: mostly oxygen

Ganymede is a natural satellite of Jupiter and is the largest and most massive moon in the Solar System. Like Saturn's largest moon, Titan, it is larger than the planet Mercury, but has somewhat less surface gravity than Mercury, Io, or Earth's Moon due to its lower density compared to the three. Ganymede orbits Jupiter in roughly seven days and is in a 1:2:4 orbital resonance with the moons Europa and Io, respectively.

Ganymede is composed of silicate rock and water in approximately equal proportions. It is a fully differentiated body with an iron-rich, liquid metallic core, giving it the lowest moment of inertia factor of any solid body in the Solar System. Its internal ocean potentially contains more water than all of Earth's oceans combined.

Ganymede is the only natural satellite in the solar system to possess an internally generated magnetic field. It is probably created by convection within its core, and influenced by tidal forces from Jupiter's far greater magnetic field. Ganymede has a thin oxygen atmosphere that includes O, O_{2}, and possibly O_{3}. Atomic hydrogen is a minor atmospheric constituent. Whether Ganymede has an ionosphere associated with its atmosphere is unresolved.

Ganymede's surface is composed of two main types of terrain, the first of which are lighter regions, generally crosscut by extensive grooves and ridges, dating from slightly less than 4 billion years ago, covering two-thirds of Ganymede. The cause of the light terrain's disrupted geology is not fully known, but may be the result of tectonic activity due to tidal heating. The second terrain type are darker regions saturated with impact craters, which are dated to four billion years ago.

Ganymede's discovery is credited to Simon Marius and Galileo Galilei, who both observed it in 1610, (Note: It is probable that the German astronomer Simon Marius discovered it independently the same year.) as the third of the Galilean moons, the first group of objects discovered orbiting another planet. Marius soon named it after Ganymede, a Trojan prince desired by Zeus, who carried him off to serve as cupbearer to the gods.

Beginning with Pioneer 10, several spacecraft have explored Ganymede. The Voyager probes, Voyager 1 and Voyager 2, refined measurements of its size, while Galileo discovered its underground ocean and magnetic field. The next planned mission to the Jovian system is the European Space Agency's Jupiter Icy Moons Explorer (Juice), which was launched in 2023. After flybys of all three icy Galilean moons, it is planned to enter orbit around Ganymede.

== History ==
Chinese astronomical records report that in 365 BC, Gan De observed a small reddish star beside Jupiter, which might have been a moon of Jupiter, possibly Ganymede, with the naked eye. However, Gan De reported the color of the companion as reddish, which is puzzling since Ganymede is too faint for its color to be perceived with the naked eye. Shi Shen and Gan De together made fairly accurate observations of the five major planets.

On January 7, 1610, Galileo Galilei used a telescope to observe what he thought were three stars near Jupiter, including what turned out to be Ganymede, Callisto, and one body that turned out to be the combined light from Io and Europa; the next night he noticed that they had moved. On January 13, he saw all four at once for the first time, but had seen each of the moons before this date at least once. By January 15, Galileo concluded that the stars were actually bodies orbiting Jupiter.

=== Name ===
Galileo claimed the right to name the moons he had discovered. He considered "Cosmian Stars" and settled on "Medicean Stars", in honor of Cosimo II de' Medici.

The French astronomer Nicolas-Claude Fabri de Peiresc suggested individual names from the Medici family for the moons, but his proposal was not taken up. Simon Marius, who had originally claimed to have found the Galilean satellites, tried to name the moons the "Saturn of Jupiter", the "Jupiter of Jupiter" (this was Ganymede), the "Venus of Jupiter", and the "Mercury of Jupiter", another nomenclature that never caught on. Later on, after finding out about a suggestion from Johannes Kepler, Marius agreed with Kepler's proposal and so he then proposed a naming system based on Greek mythology instead. This final Kepler/Marius proposal was ultimately successful.

Jupiter is much blamed by the poets on account of his irregular loves. Three maidens are especially mentioned as having been clandestinely courted by Jupiter with success. Io, daughter of the River Inachus, Callisto of Lycaon, Europa of Agenor. Then there was Ganymede, the handsome son of King Tros, whom Jupiter, having taken the form of an eagle, transported to heaven on his back, as poets fabulously tell... I think, therefore, that I shall not have done amiss if the First is called by me Io, the Second Europa, the Third, on account of its majesty of light, Ganymede, the Fourth Callisto...

This name and those of the other Galilean satellites fell into disfavor for a considerable time, and were not in common use until the mid-20th century. In much of the earlier astronomical literature, Ganymede is referred to instead by its Roman numeral designation, Jupiter III (a system introduced by Galileo), in other words "the third satellite of Jupiter". Following the discovery of moons of Saturn, a naming system based on that of Kepler and Marius was used for Jupiter's moons. Ganymede is the only Galilean moon of Jupiter named after a male figure—like Io, Europa, and Callisto, he was a lover of Zeus.

In English, the Galilean satellites Io, Europa and Callisto have the Latin spellings of their names, but the Latin form of Ganymede is Ganymēdēs, which would be pronounced /ˌɡænɪˈmiːdiːz/. However, the final syllable is dropped in English, perhaps under the influence of French Ganymède ([ɡanimɛd]).

Planetary moons other than Earth's were never given symbols in the astronomical literature. Denis Moskowitz, a software engineer who designed most of the dwarf planet symbols, proposed a Greek gamma (the initial of Ganymede) combined with the cross-bar of the Jupiter symbol as the symbol of Ganymede. This symbol is not widely used.

== Orbit and rotation ==
Laplace resonance of Ganymede, Europa, and Io (conjunctions are highlighted by color changes)

Plot of vertical position y vs time t of the animation above

Ganymede orbits Jupiter at a distance of 1,070,400 kilometres (665,100 mi), third among the Galilean satellites, and completes a revolution every seven days and three hours (7.155 days). Like most known moons, Ganymede is tidally locked, with one side always facing toward the planet, hence its day is also seven days and three hours. Its orbit is very slightly eccentric and inclined to the Jovian equator, with the eccentricity and inclination changing quasi-periodically due to solar and planetary gravitational perturbations on a timescale of centuries. The ranges of change are 0.0009–0.0022 and 0.05–0.32°, respectively. These orbital variations cause the axial tilt (the angle between the rotational and orbital axes) to vary between 0 and 0.33°.

Ganymede participates in orbital resonances with Europa and Io: for every orbit of Ganymede, Europa orbits twice and Io orbits four times. Conjunctions (alignment on the same side of Jupiter) between Io and Europa occur when Io is at periapsis and Europa at apoapsis. Conjunctions between Europa and Ganymede occur when Europa is at periapsis. The longitudes of the Io–Europa and Europa–Ganymede conjunctions change at the same rate, making triple conjunctions impossible. Such a complicated resonance is called the Laplace resonance. The current Laplace resonance is unable to pump the orbital eccentricity of Ganymede to a higher value. The value of about 0.0013 is probably a remnant from a previous epoch, when such pumping was possible. The Ganymedian orbital eccentricity is somewhat puzzling; if it is not pumped now it should have decayed long ago due to the tidal dissipation in the interior of Ganymede. This means that the last episode of the eccentricity excitation happened only several hundred million years ago. Because Ganymede's orbital eccentricity is relatively low—on average 0.0015—tidal heating is negligible now. However, in the past Ganymede may have passed through one or more Laplace-like resonances (Note: A Laplace-like resonance is similar to the current Laplace resonance among the Galilean moons with the only difference being that longitudes of the Io–Europa and Europa–Ganymede conjunctions change with rates whose ratio is a non-unity rational number. If the ratio is unity, then the resonance is the Laplace resonance.) that were able to pump the orbital eccentricity to a value as high as 0.01–0.02. This probably caused a significant tidal heating of the interior of Ganymede; the formation of the grooved terrain may be a result of one or more heating episodes.

There are two hypotheses for the origin of the Laplace resonance among Io, Europa, and Ganymede: that it is primordial and has existed from the beginning of the Solar System; or that it developed after the formation of the Solar System. A possible sequence of events for the latter scenario is as follows: Io raised tides on Jupiter, causing Io's orbit to expand (due to conservation of momentum) until it encountered the 2:1 resonance with Europa; after that, the expansion continued, but some of the angular moment was transferred to Europa as the resonance caused its orbit to expand as well; the process continued until Europa encountered the 2:1 resonance with Ganymede. Eventually the drift rates of conjunctions between all three moons were synchronized and locked in the Laplace resonance.

== Bulk properties ==
=== Size ===
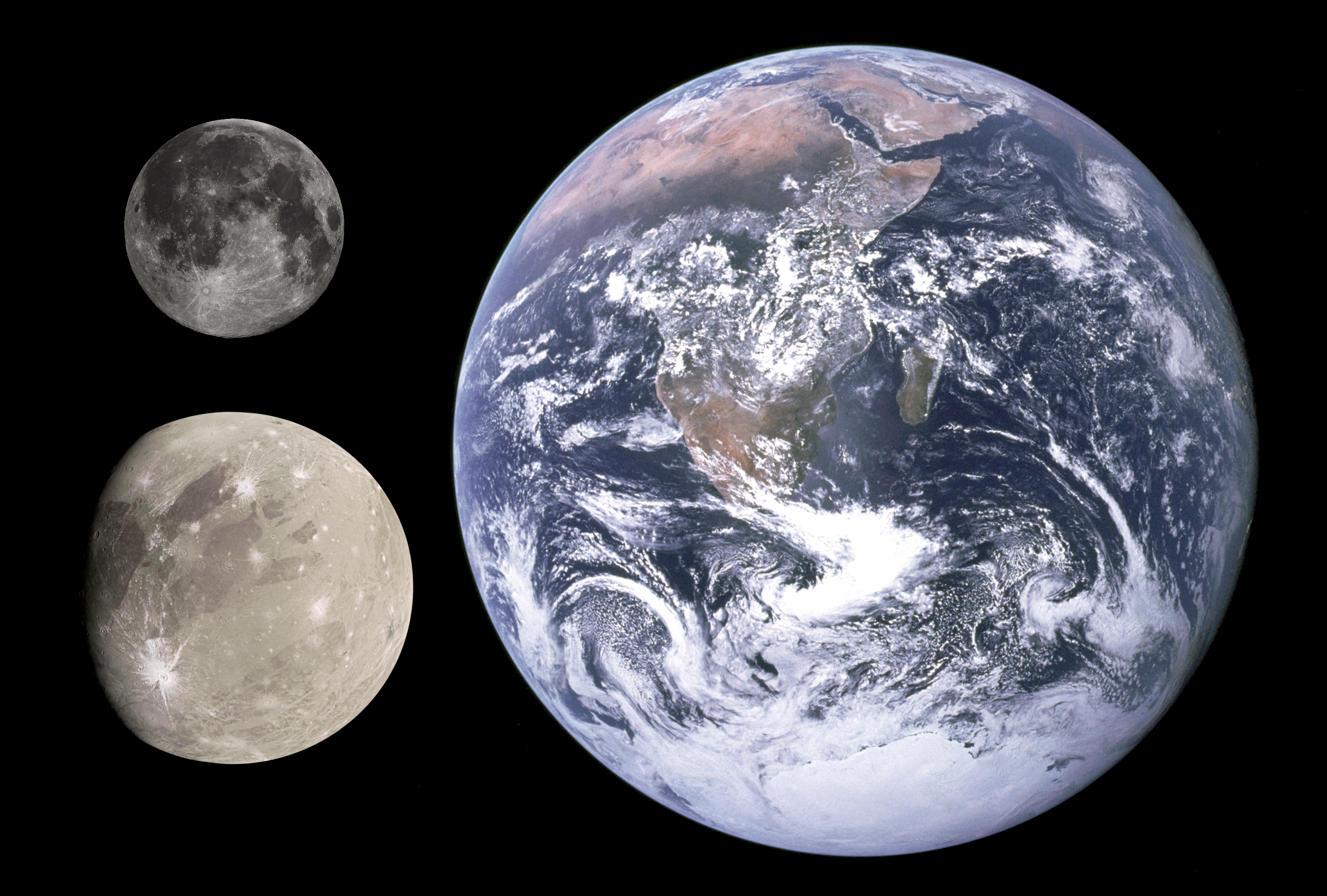
Size comparison of Earth, the Moon (top left), and Ganymede (bottom left)

With a diameter of about 5,270 kilometres (3,270 mi) and a mass of 1.48×10^{20} tonnes (1.48×10^{23} kg; 3.26×10^{23} lb), Ganymede is the largest and most massive moon in the Solar System. It is slightly more massive than the second most massive moon, Saturn's satellite Titan, and is more than twice as massive as the Earth's Moon. It is larger than the planet Mercury, which has a diameter of 4,880 kilometres (3,030 mi) but is only 45 percent of Mercury's mass. Ganymede is the ninth-largest object in the solar system, but the tenth-most massive.

=== Composition ===
The average density of Ganymede, 1.936 g/cm^{3} (a bit greater than Callisto's), suggests a composition of about equal parts rocky material and mostly water ices. Some of the water is liquid, forming an underground ocean. The mass fraction of ices is between 46 and 50 percent, which is slightly lower than that in Callisto. Some additional volatile ices such as ammonia may also be present. The exact composition of Ganymede's rock is not known, but is probably close to the composition of L/LL type ordinary chondrites, which are characterized by less total iron, less metallic iron and more iron oxide than H chondrites. The weight ratio of iron to silicon ranges between 1.05 and 1.27 in Ganymede, whereas the solar ratio is around 1.8.

=== Internal structure ===
Ganymede appears to be fully differentiated, with an internal structure consisting of an iron-sulfide–iron core, a silicate mantle, and outer layers of water ice and liquid water. The precise thicknesses of the different layers in the interior of Ganymede depend on the assumed composition of silicates (fraction of olivine and pyroxene) and amount of sulfur in the core. Ganymede has the lowest moment of inertia factor, 0.31, among the solid Solar System bodies. This is a consequence of its substantial water content and fully differentiated interior.

==== Subsurface oceans ====
Artist's cut-away representation of the internal structure of Ganymede. Layers drawn to scale.

In the 1970s, NASA scientists first suspected that Ganymede had a thick ocean between two layers of ice, one on the surface and one beneath a liquid ocean and atop the rocky mantle. In the 1990s, NASA's Galileo mission flew by Ganymede, and found indications of such a subsurface ocean. An analysis published in 2014, taking into account the realistic thermodynamics for water and effects of salt, suggests that Ganymede might have a stack of several ocean layers separated by different phases of ice, with the lowest liquid layer adjacent to the rocky mantle. Water–rock contact may be an important factor in the origin of life. The analysis also notes that the extreme depths involved (~800 km to the rocky "seafloor") mean that temperatures at the bottom of a convective (adiabatic) ocean can be up to 40 K higher than those at the ice–water interface.

In March 2015, scientists reported that measurements with the Hubble Space Telescope of how the aurorae moved confirmed that Ganymede has a subsurface ocean. A large saltwater ocean affects Ganymede's magnetic field, and consequently, its aurorae. The evidence suggests that Ganymede's oceans might be the largest in the entire Solar System. These observations were later supported by Juno, which detected various salts and other compounds on Ganymede's surface, including hydrated sodium chloride, ammonium chloride, sodium bicarbonate, and possibly aliphatic aldehydes. These compounds were potentially deposited from Ganymede's ocean in past resurfacing events and were discovered to be most abundant in Ganymede's lower latitudes, shielded by its small magnetosphere. As a result of these findings, there is increasing speculation on the potential habitability of Ganymede's ocean.

==== Core ====
The existence of a liquid, iron–nickel-rich core provides a natural explanation for the intrinsic magnetic field of Ganymede detected by Galileo spacecraft. The convection in the liquid iron, which has high electrical conductivity, is the most reasonable model of magnetic field generation. The density of the core is 5.5–6 g/cm^{3} and the silicate mantle is 3.4–3.6 g/cm^{3}. The radius of this core may be up to 500 km. The temperature in the core of Ganymede is probably 1500–1700 K and pressure up to 10 GPa (99,000 atm).

=== Magnetosphere ===
Magnetic field of the Jovian satellite Ganymede, which is embedded into the magnetosphere of Jupiter. Closed field lines are marked with green color.

The Galileo craft made six close flybys of Ganymede from 1995 to 2000 (G1, G2, G7, G8, G28 and G29) and discovered that Ganymede has a permanent (intrinsic) magnetic moment independent of the Jovian magnetic field. The value of the moment is about 1.3 × 10^{13} T·m^{3}, which is three times larger than the magnetic moment of Mercury. The magnetic dipole is tilted with respect to the rotational axis of Ganymede by 176°, which means that it is directed against the Jovian magnetic moment. Its north pole lies below the orbital plane. The dipole magnetic field created by this permanent moment has a strength of 719 ± 2 nT at Ganymede's equator, which should be compared with the Jovian magnetic field at the distance of Ganymede—about 120 nT. The equatorial field of Ganymede is directed against the Jovian field, meaning reconnection is possible. The intrinsic field strength at the poles is two times that at the equator—1440 nT.

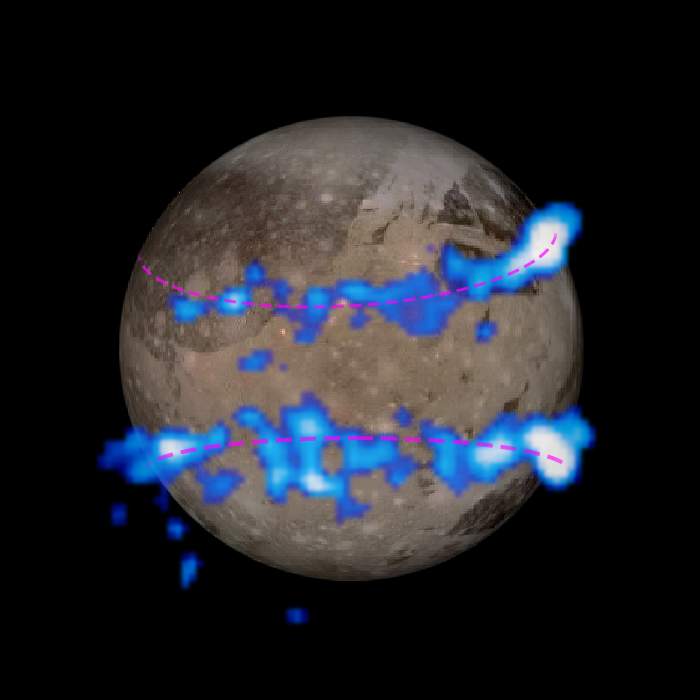
Aurorae on Ganymede—auroral belt shifting may indicate a subsurface saline ocean.

The permanent magnetic moment carves a part of space around Ganymede, creating a tiny magnetosphere embedded inside that of Jupiter; it is the only moon in the Solar System known to possess the feature. Its diameter is 4–5 Ganymede radii. The Ganymedian magnetosphere has a region of closed field lines located below 30° latitude, where charged particles (electrons and ions) are trapped, creating a kind of radiation belt. The main ion species in the magnetosphere is single ionized oxygen (O^{+}) which fits well with Ganymede's tenuous oxygen atmosphere. In the polar cap regions, at latitudes higher than 30°, magnetic field lines are open, connecting Ganymede with Jupiter's ionosphere. In these areas, the energetic (tens and hundreds of kiloelectronvolt) electrons and ions have been detected, which may cause the auroras observed around the Ganymedian poles. In addition, heavy ions precipitate continuously on Ganymede's polar surface, sputtering and darkening the ice.

The interaction between the Ganymedian magnetosphere and Jovian plasma is in many respects similar to that of the solar wind and Earth's magnetosphere. The plasma co-rotating with Jupiter impinges on the trailing side of the Ganymedian magnetosphere much like the solar wind impinges on the Earth's magnetosphere. The main difference is the speed of plasma flow—supersonic in the case of Earth and subsonic in the case of Ganymede. Because of the subsonic flow, there is no bow shock off the trailing hemisphere of Ganymede.

In addition to the intrinsic magnetic moment, Ganymede has an induced dipole magnetic field. Its existence is connected with the variation of the Jovian magnetic field near Ganymede. The induced moment is directed radially to or from Jupiter following the direction of the varying part of the planetary magnetic field. The induced magnetic moment is an order of magnitude weaker than the intrinsic one. The field strength of the induced field at the magnetic equator is about 60 nT—half of that of the ambient Jovian field. The induced magnetic field of Ganymede is similar to those of Callisto and Europa, indicating that Ganymede also has a subsurface water ocean with a high electrical conductivity.

Given that Ganymede is completely differentiated and has a metallic core, its intrinsic magnetic field is probably generated in a similar fashion to the Earth's: as a result of conducting material moving in the interior. The magnetic field detected around Ganymede is likely to be caused by compositional convection in the core, if the magnetic field is the product of dynamo action, or magnetoconvection.

Despite the presence of an iron core, Ganymede's magnetosphere remains enigmatic, particularly given that similar bodies lack the feature. Some research has suggested that, given its relatively small size, the core ought to have sufficiently cooled to the point where fluid motions, hence a magnetic field would not be sustained. One explanation is that the same orbital resonances proposed to have disrupted the surface also allowed the magnetic field to persist: with Ganymede's eccentricity pumped and tidal heating of the mantle increased during such resonances, reducing heat flow from the core, leaving it fluid and convective. Another explanation is a remnant magnetization of silicate rocks in the mantle, which is possible if the satellite had a more significant dynamo-generated field in the past.

== Surface environment ==
=== Surface features ===
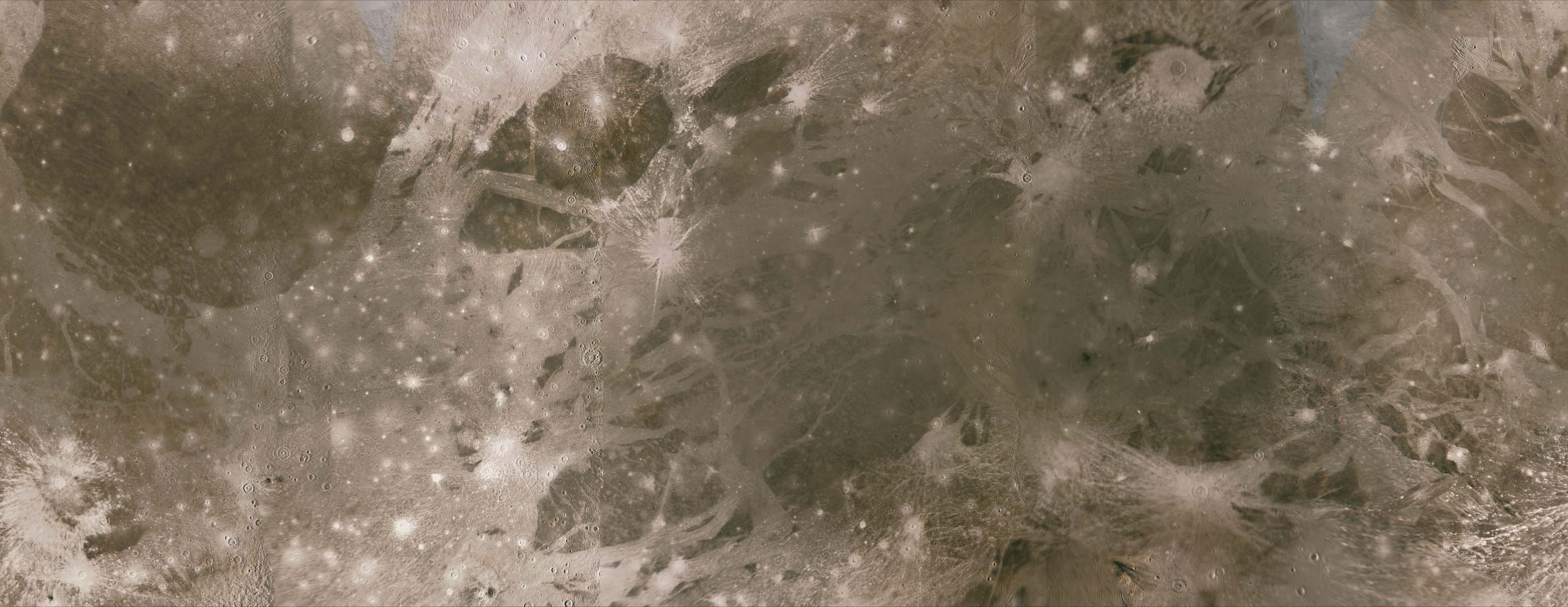
Surface map of Ganymede from 57°N to 57°S.

Ganymede's surface has an albedo of about 43 percent. Water ice seems to be ubiquitous on its surface, with a mass fraction of 50–90 percent, significantly more than in Ganymede as a whole. Near-infrared spectroscopy has revealed the presence of strong water ice absorption bands at wavelengths of 1.04, 1.25, 1.5, 2.0 and 3.0 μm. The grooved terrain is brighter and has a more icy composition than the dark terrain. The analysis of high-resolution, near-infrared and UV spectra obtained by the Galileo spacecraft and from Earth observations has revealed various non-water materials: carbon dioxide, sulfur dioxide and, possibly, cyanogen, hydrogen sulfate and various organic compounds. Galileo results have also shown magnesium sulfate (MgSO_{4}) and, possibly, sodium sulfate (Na_{2}SO_{4}) on Ganymede's surface. These salts may originate from the subsurface ocean.

The Ganymedian surface albedo is very asymmetric; the leading hemisphere (Note: The leading hemisphere is the hemisphere facing the direction of orbital motion; the trailing hemisphere faces the reverse direction.) is brighter than the trailing one. This is similar to Europa, but the reverse for Callisto. The trailing hemisphere of Ganymede appears to be enriched in sulfur dioxide. The distribution of carbon dioxide does not demonstrate any hemispheric asymmetry, but little or no carbon dioxide is observed near the poles. Impact craters on Ganymede (except one) do not show any enrichment in carbon dioxide, which also distinguishes it from Callisto. Ganymede's carbon dioxide gas was probably depleted in the past. Ganymede's surface is a mix of two types of terrain: very old, highly cratered, dark regions and somewhat younger (but still ancient), lighter regions marked with an extensive array of grooves and ridges. The dark terrain, which comprises about one-third of the surface, contains clays and organic materials that could indicate the composition of the impactors from which Jovian satellites accreted.

The heating mechanism required for the formation of the grooved terrain on Ganymede is an unsolved problem in the planetary sciences. The modern view is that the grooved terrain is mainly tectonic in nature. Cryovolcanism is thought to have played only a minor role, if any. The forces that caused the strong stresses in the Ganymedian ice lithosphere necessary to initiate the tectonic activity may be connected to the tidal heating events in the past, possibly caused when the satellite passed through unstable orbital resonances. The tidal flexing of the ice may have heated the interior and strained the lithosphere, leading to the development of cracks and horst and graben faulting, which erased the old, dark terrain on 70 percent of the surface. The formation of the grooved terrain may also be connected with the early core formation and subsequent tidal heating of Ganymede's interior, which may have caused a slight expansion of Ganymede by one to six percent due to phase transitions in ice and thermal expansion. During subsequent evolution deep, hot water plumes may have risen from the core to the surface, leading to the tectonic deformation of the lithosphere. Radiogenic heating within the satellite is the most relevant current heat source, contributing, for instance, to ocean depth. Research models have found that if the orbital eccentricity were an order of magnitude greater than currently (as it may have been in the past), tidal heating would be a more substantial heat source than radiogenic heating.

Cratering is seen on both types of terrain, but is especially extensive on the dark terrain: it appears to be saturated with impact craters and has evolved largely through impact events. The brighter, grooved terrain contains many fewer impact features, which have been only of minor importance to its tectonic evolution. The density of cratering indicates an age of 4 billion years for the dark terrain, similar to the highlands of the Moon, and a somewhat younger age for the grooved terrain (but how much younger is uncertain). Ganymede may have experienced a period of heavy cratering 3.5 to 4 billion years ago similar to that of the Moon. If true, the vast majority of impacts happened in that epoch, whereas the cratering rate has been much smaller since. Craters both overlay and are crosscut by the groove systems, indicating that some of the grooves are quite ancient. Relatively young craters with rays of ejecta are also visible. Ganymede is the icy moon with the greatest number of known ray craters in the Solar System.

Ray craters on Ganymede's leading hemisphere, such as Osiris, are brighter than comparable ray craters on the trailing hemisphere, such as Hershef. Using Galileo's Near Infrared Mapping Spectrometer (NIMS), planetary scientists found that the spectra of ray craters on Ganymede's trailing hemisphere differ from those of ray craters on the leading hemisphere. Ray craters on the trailing hemisphere exhibit significantly lower reflectance at wavelengths longer than 3 μm, indicating the presence of coarser-grained water ice. In contrast, ray craters on the leading hemisphere are dominated by finer-grained ice. This difference is thought to result from the distinct space environments of the two hemispheres. Scientists interpret the darker infrared appearance of trailing-hemisphere ray craters as the result of charged-particle bombardment (sputtering), which alters the surface ice, rather than as evidence that the craters are older. Ganymedian craters are flatter than those on the Moon and Mercury. This is probably due to the relatively weak nature of Ganymede's icy crust, which can (or could) flow and thereby soften the relief.

Ancient craters whose relief has mostly disappeared, leaving only a "ghost" of the crater, such as Memphis Facula and Zakar, are known as palimpsests.

One significant feature on Ganymede is a dark plain named Galileo Regio, which contains a series of concentric grooves, or furrows called Fossae, likely created during a period of geologic activity.

Ganymede also has polar caps, likely composed of water frost. The frost extends to 40° latitude. These polar caps were first seen by the Voyager spacecraft. Theories on the formation of the caps include the migration of water to higher latitudes and the bombardment of the ice by plasma. Data from Galileo suggests the latter is correct. The presence of a magnetic field on Ganymede results in more intense charged particle bombardment of its surface in the unprotected polar regions; sputtering then leads to redistribution of water molecules, with frost migrating to locally colder areas within the polar terrain.

A crater named Anat provides the reference point for measuring longitude on Ganymede. By definition, Anat is at 128° longitude. The 0° longitude directly faces Jupiter, and unless stated otherwise longitude increases toward the west.

=== Atmosphere and ionosphere ===
In 1972, a team of Indian, British and American astronomers working in Java, Indonesia and Kavalur, India claimed that they had detected a thin atmosphere during an occultation, when it and Jupiter passed in front of a star. They estimated that the surface pressure was around 0.1 Pa (1 microbar). However, in 1979, Voyager 1 observed an occultation of the star κ Centauri during its flyby of Jupiter, with differing results. The occultation measurements were conducted in the far-ultraviolet spectrum at wavelengths shorter than 200 nm, which were much more sensitive to the presence of gases than the 1972 measurements made in the visible spectrum. No atmosphere was revealed by the Voyager data. The upper limit on the surface particle number density was found to be 1.5×10^{9} cm^{−3}, which corresponds to a surface pressure of less than 2.5 μPa (25 picobar). The latter value is almost five orders of magnitude less than the 1972 estimate.

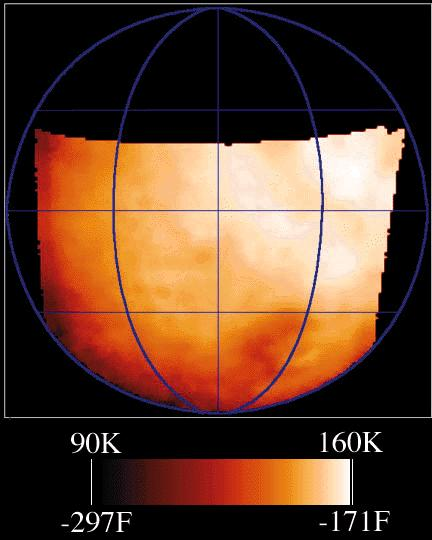
False-color temperature map of Ganymede

Despite the Voyager data, evidence for a tenuous oxygen atmosphere (exosphere) on Ganymede, very similar to the one found on Europa, was found by the Hubble Space Telescope (HST) in 1995. HST actually observed airglow of atomic oxygen in the far-ultraviolet at the wavelengths 130.4 nm and 135.6 nm. Such an airglow is excited when molecular oxygen is dissociated by electron impacts, which is evidence of a significant neutral atmosphere composed predominantly of O_{2} molecules. The surface number density probably lies in the (1.2–7)×10^{8} cm^{−3} range, corresponding to the surface pressure of 0.2–1.2 μPa. (Note: The surface number density and pressure were calculated from the column densities reported in Hall, et al. 1998, assuming a scale height of 20 km and temperature 120 K.) These values are in agreement with Voyager's upper limit set in 1981. The oxygen is not evidence of life; it is thought to be produced when water ice on Ganymede's surface is split into hydrogen and oxygen by radiation, with the hydrogen then being more rapidly lost due to its low atomic mass. The airglow observed over Ganymede is not spatially homogeneous like that observed over Europa. HST observed two bright spots located in the northern and southern hemispheres, near ± 50° latitude, which is exactly the boundary between the open and closed field lines of the Ganymedian magnetosphere (see below). The bright spots are probably polar auroras, caused by plasma precipitation along the open field lines.

The existence of a neutral atmosphere implies that an ionosphere should exist, because oxygen molecules are ionized by the impacts of the energetic electrons coming from the magnetosphere and by solar EUV radiation. However, the nature of the Ganymedian ionosphere is as controversial as the nature of the atmosphere. Some Galileo measurements found an elevated electron density near Ganymede, suggesting an ionosphere, whereas others failed to detect anything. The electron density near the surface is estimated by different sources to lie in the range 400–2,500 cm^{−3}. As of 2008, the parameters of the ionosphere of Ganymede were not well constrained.

Additional evidence of the oxygen atmosphere comes from spectral detection of gases trapped in the ice at the surface of Ganymede. The detection of ozone (O_{3}) bands was announced in 1996. In 1997 spectroscopic analysis revealed the dimer (or diatomic) absorption features of molecular oxygen. Such an absorption can arise only if the oxygen is in a dense phase. The best candidate is molecular oxygen trapped in ice. The depth of the dimer absorption bands depends on latitude and longitude, rather than on surface albedo—they tend to decrease with increasing latitude on Ganymede, whereas O_{3} shows an opposite trend. Laboratory work has found that O_{2} would not cluster or bubble but would dissolve in ice at Ganymede's relatively warm surface temperature of 100 K (−173.15 °C). High-pressure experiments have since shown that this oxygen-bearing ice can persist as a distinct oxygen hydrate phase at pressures up to at least 2.6 GPa, suggesting that surface-trapped oxygen could in principle be carried to much greater depths within Ganymede's ice shell than previously assumed, rather than being confined to a thin surface layer.

A search for sodium in the atmosphere, just after such a finding on Europa, turned up nothing in 1997. Sodium is at least 13 times less abundant around Ganymede than around Europa, possibly because of a relative deficiency at the surface or because the magnetosphere fends off energetic particles. Another minor constituent of the Ganymedian atmosphere is atomic hydrogen. Hydrogen atoms were observed as far as 3,000 km from Ganymede's surface. Their density on the surface is about 1.5×10^{4} cm^{−3}.

In 2021, water vapour was detected in the atmosphere of Ganymede.

=== Radiation environment ===
The radiation level at the surface of Ganymede is considerably lower than on Europa, being 50–80 mSv (5–8 rem) per day, an amount that would cause severe illness or death in human beings exposed for two months.

== Origin and evolution ==
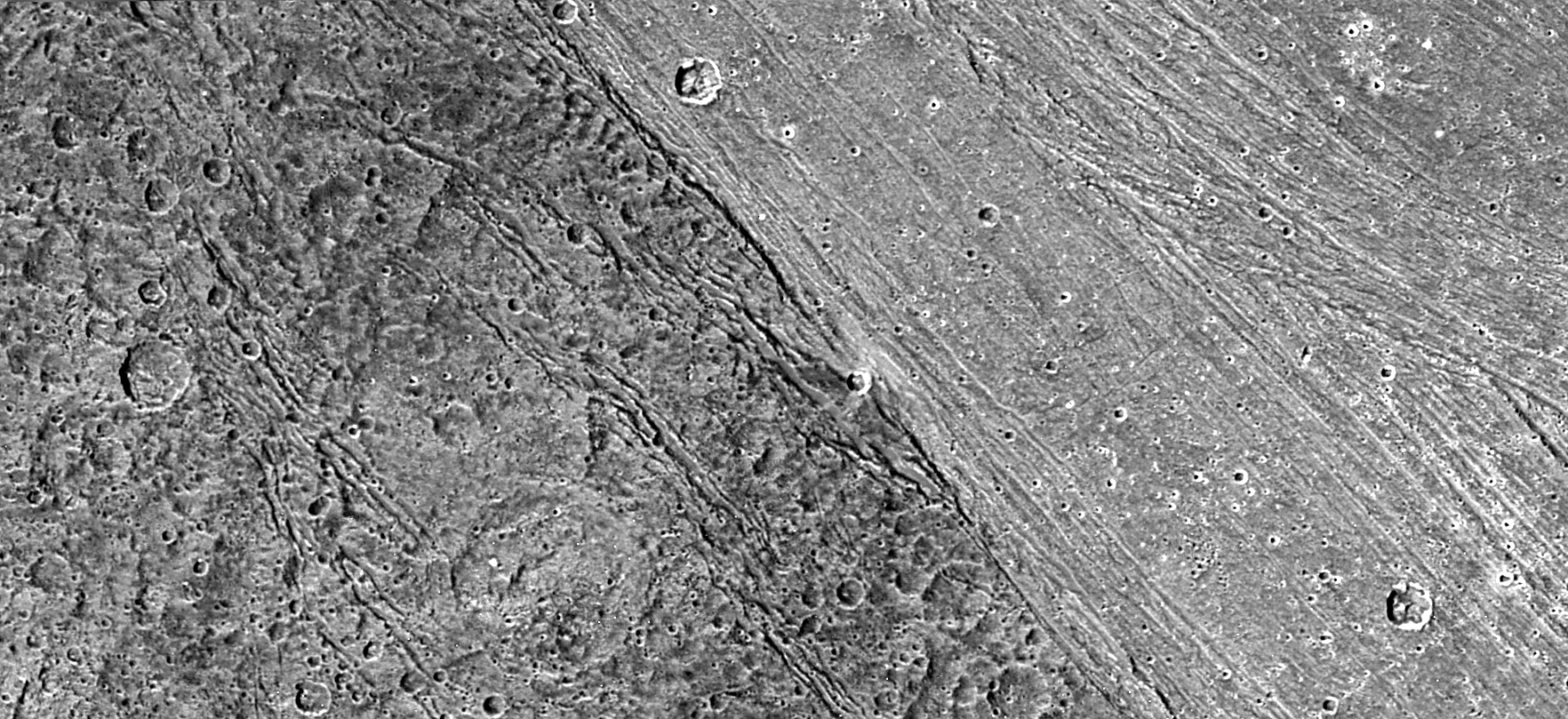
A sharp boundary divides the ancient dark terrain of Nicholson Regio from the younger, finely striated bright terrain of Harpagia Sulcus.

Ganymede probably formed by an accretion in Jupiter's subnebula, a disk of gas and dust surrounding Jupiter after its formation. The accretion of Ganymede probably took about 10,000 years, much shorter than the 100,000 years estimated for Callisto. The Jovian subnebula may have been relatively "gas-starved" when the Galilean satellites formed; this would have allowed for the lengthy accretion times required for Callisto. In contrast, Ganymede formed closer to Jupiter, where the subnebula was denser, which explains its shorter formation timescale. This relatively fast formation prevented the escape of accretional heat, which may have led to ice melt and differentiation: the separation of the rocks and ice. The rocks settled to the center, forming the core. In this respect, Ganymede is different from Callisto, which apparently failed to melt and differentiate early due to loss of the accretional heat during its slower formation. This hypothesis explains why the two Jovian moons look so dissimilar, despite their similar mass and composition. Alternative theories explain Ganymede's greater internal heating on the basis of tidal flexing or more intense pummeling by impactors during the Late Heavy Bombardment. In the latter case, modeling suggests that differentiation would become a runaway process at Ganymede but not Callisto.

After formation, Ganymede's core largely retained the heat accumulated during accretion and differentiation, only slowly releasing it to the ice mantle. The mantle, in turn, transported it to the surface by convection. The decay of radioactive elements within rocks further heated the core, causing increased differentiation: an inner, iron–iron-sulfide core and a silicate mantle formed. With this, Ganymede became a fully differentiated body. By comparison, the radioactive heating of undifferentiated Callisto caused convection in its icy interior, which effectively cooled it and prevented large-scale melting of ice and rapid differentiation. The convective motions in Callisto have caused only a partial separation of rock and ice. Today, Ganymede continues to cool slowly. The heat being released from its core and silicate mantle enables the subsurface ocean to exist, whereas the slow cooling of the liquid Fe–FeS core causes convection and supports magnetic field generation. The current heat flux out of Ganymede is probably higher than that out of Callisto.

A study from 2020 by Hirata, Suetsugu and Ohtsuki suggests that Ganymede probably was hit by a massive asteroid 4 billion years ago; an impact so violent that may have shifted the moon's axis. The study came to this conclusion analyzing images of the furrows system in the satellite's surface.

=== Geological periods ===
The United States Geological Survey (USGS) divides Ganymede's geologic history into three periods: the Nicholsonian, Harpagian, and Gilgameshan periods. The earliest period of Ganymede's history is called the Nicholsonian Period, an ancient era during which the moon's originally bright, icy surface became contaminated with dark, non-ice material from space, causing it to darken in a manner similar to what is observed in Nicholson Regio at present.

During the Harpagian Period, extensive tectonic activity resurfaced and erased about two-thirds of Ganymede's original ancient dark terrain. This period is named after the grooved terrain called Harpagia Sulcus, which is believed to be one of the products of this global tectonic upheaval. This resurfacing transformed much of Ganymede's original dark surface into the bright terrain seen today. Most of Ganymede's bright, grooved terrain formed during this resurfacing event.

The Gilgameshan Period is the youngest major geologic period on Ganymede's history and is defined by the formation of the Gilgamesh impact basin. The basin-forming impact was significant enough to mark the beginning of a new geologic period, similar to how major events define geologic periods on Earth. Geological activity during this period was dominated by impact cratering, with no evidence of major tectonic resurfacing. Early in the period, a small number of palimpsests and heavily degraded craters formed, whereas later impacts produced progressively better-preserved craters with more pronounced topographic relief. This transition has been interpreted as evidence that Ganymede's internal heat flow declined substantially during the Gilgameshan Period, causing the moon's cold, rigid outer ice shell to thicken and more effectively preserve impact crater morphology.

== Exploration ==
Several spacecraft have performed close flybys of Ganymede: two Pioneer and two Voyager spacecraft made a single flyby each between 1973 and 1979; the Galileo spacecraft made six passes between 1996 and 2000; and the Juno spacecraft performed two flybys in 2019 and 2021. No spacecraft has yet orbited Ganymede, but the Juice mission, which launched in April 2023, intends to do so.

=== Completed flybys ===
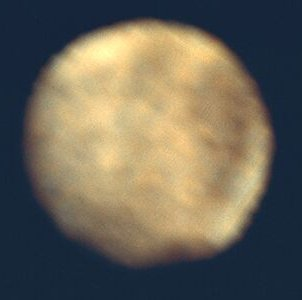
Ganymede from Pioneer 10 (1973)

The first spacecraft to approach close to Ganymede was Pioneer 10, which performed a flyby in 1973 as it passed through the Jovian system at high speed. Pioneer 11 made a similar flyby in 1974. Data sent back by the two spacecraft was used to determine the moon's physical characteristics and provided images of the surface with up to 400 km (250 mi) resolution. Pioneer 10's closest approach was 446,250 km, about 85 times Ganymede's diameter.

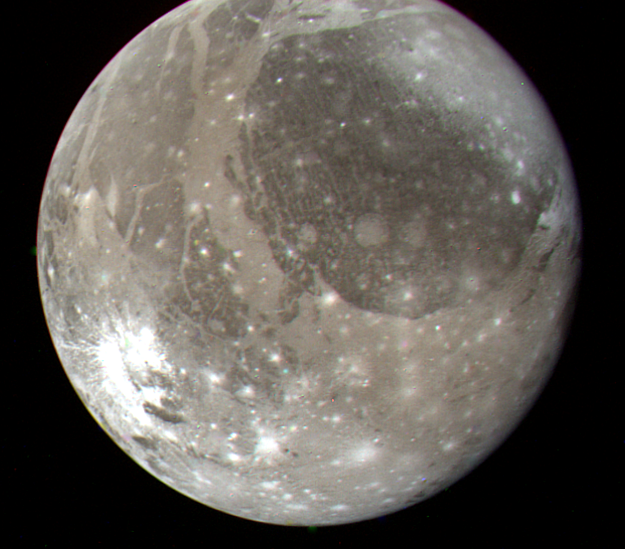
A mosaic image of the side of Ganymede that is always facing away from Jupiter, taken by Voyager 2 in July 1979 (Note: The bright ray crater on the lower left near the limb of Ganymede is the crater Osiris.)

Voyager 1 and Voyager 2 both studied Ganymede when passing through the Jovian system in 1979. Data from those flybys were used to refine the size of Ganymede, revealing it was larger than Saturn's moon Titan, which was previously thought to have been bigger. Images from the Voyagers provided the first views of the moon's grooved surface terrain. Voyager 1 imaged the Jupiter-facing hemisphere of Ganymede, while Voyager 2 imaged the antijovian hemisphere.

The Pioneer and Voyager flybys were all at large distances and high speeds, as they flew on unbound trajectories through the Jupiter system. Better data can be obtained from a spacecraft which is orbiting Jupiter, as it can encounter Ganymede at a lower speed and adjust the orbit for a closer approach. In 1995, the Galileo spacecraft entered orbit around Jupiter and between 1996 and 2000 made six close flybys of Ganymede. These flybys were denoted G1, G2, G7, G8, G28 and G29. During the closest flyby (G2), Galileo passed just 264 km from the surface of Ganymede (five percent of the moon's diameter), which remains the closest approach by any spacecraft. During the G1 flyby in 1996, Galileo instruments detected Ganymede's magnetic field. Data from the Galileo flybys was used to discover the sub-surface ocean, which was announced in 2001. High spatial resolution spectra of Ganymede taken by Galileo were used to identify several non-ice compounds on the surface.

The Cassini–Huygens space probe became the next spacecraft to visit Ganymede when it flew through the Jovian system in December 2000 to obtain a gravity assist from Jupiter on its way to Saturn. At its closest approach, Cassini was 10,350,000 km (6,430,000 mi) away from Ganymede, resulting in very low-resolution images of the moon. Only Ganymede's largest surface features could be distinguished in Cassini's images.

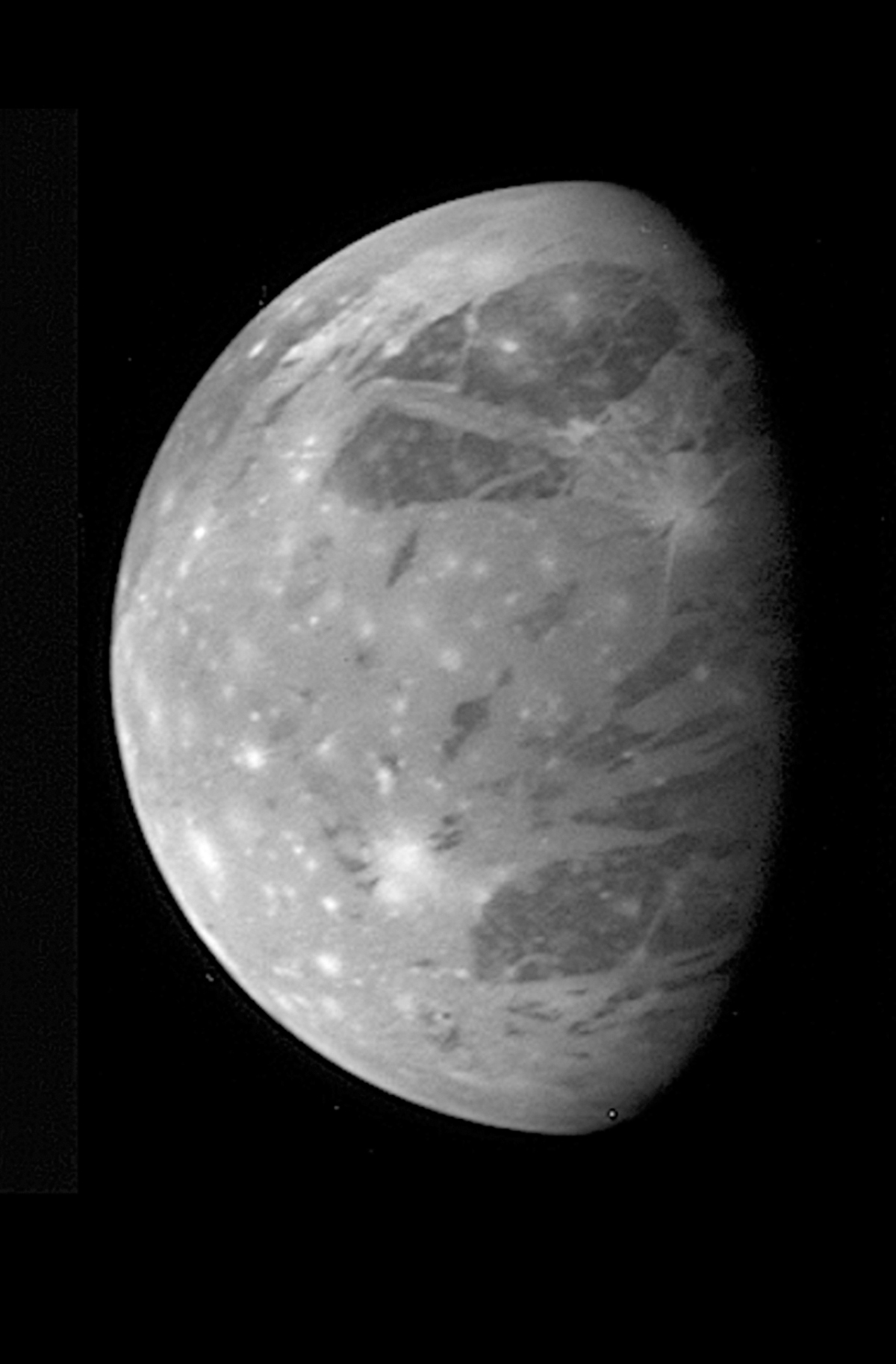
A distant image of Ganymede, taken by the New Horizons spacecraft in February 2007

The New Horizons spacecraft also observed Ganymede, but from a much larger distance of 3,500,000 km (2,200,000 mi) as it passed through the Jovian system in 2007 while en route to Pluto. The data were used to perform topographic and compositional mapping of Ganymede.

Like Galileo, the Juno spacecraft orbited Jupiter. On 2019 December 25, Juno performed a distant flyby of Ganymede during its 24th orbit of Jupiter, at a range of 97,680 to 109,439 kilometers (60,696 to 68,002 mi). This flyby provided images of the moon's polar regions. In June 2021, Juno performed a second flyby, at a closer distance of 1,038 kilometers (645 mi). This encounter was designed to provide a gravity assist to reduce Juno's orbital period from 53 days to 43 days. Additional images of the surface were collected.

=== Future missions ===
ESA's Jupiter Icy Moons Explorer (Juice) will be the first to enter orbit around Ganymede itself. Juice was launched on April 14, 2023. It is intended to perform its first flyby of Ganymede in 2031, then enter orbit of the moon in 2032. When the spacecraft consumes its propellant, Juice is planned to be deorbited and impact Ganymede in February 2034.

In addition to Juice, NASA's Europa Clipper, which was launched in October 2024, will conduct 4 close flybys of Ganymede beginning in 2030. It may also crash into Ganymede at the end of its mission to aid Juice in studying the surface's geochemistry.

=== Cancelled proposals ===
Several other missions have been proposed to flyby or orbit Ganymede, but were either not selected for funding or cancelled before launch.

The Jupiter Icy Moons Orbiter would have studied Ganymede in greater detail. However, the mission was canceled in 2005. Another old proposal was called The Grandeur of Ganymede.

A Ganymede orbiter based on the Juno probe was proposed in 2010 for the Planetary Science Decadal Survey. The mission was not supported, with the Decadal Survey preferring the Europa Clipper mission instead.

The Europa Jupiter System Mission had a proposed launch date of 2020, and was a joint NASA and ESA proposal for exploration of many of Jupiter's moons including Ganymede. In February 2009 it was announced that ESA and NASA had given this mission priority ahead of the Titan Saturn System Mission. The mission was to consist of the NASA-led Jupiter Europa Orbiter, the ESA-led Jupiter Ganymede Orbiter, and possibly a JAXA-led Jupiter Magnetospheric Orbiter. The NASA and JAXA components were later cancelled, and ESA's appeared likely to be cancelled too, but in 2012 ESA announced it would go ahead alone. The European part of the mission became the Jupiter Icy Moons Explorer (Juice).

The Russian Space Research Institute proposed a Ganymede lander astrobiology mission called Laplace-P, possibly in partnership with Juice. If selected, it would have been launched in 2023. The mission was cancelled due to a lack of funding in 2017.

== See also ==
- Galilean moons (the four largest moons of Jupiter)
  - Callisto
  - Europa
  - Ganymede
  - Io
- Jupiter's moons in fiction
- Cold trap (astronomy)
- List of craters on Ganymede
- List of geological features on Ganymede
- List of natural satellites
- Lunar and Planetary Institute
