= JMO =

JMO may refer to:

- Jomsom Airport, in Nepal
- Jupiter Magnetospheric Orbiter
- Yugoslav Muslim Organization (Bosnian: Jugoslovenska Muslimanska Organizacija)
- Journal des marches et opérations, a French expression for a war diary
- Junior Mathematical Olympiad, a math competition organized by the United Kingdom Mathematics Trust
- United States of America Junior Mathematical Olympiad (USAJMO), an American high school mathematics competition
