= Jupiter Ganymede Orbiter =

Cancelled ESA mission concept to Ganymede

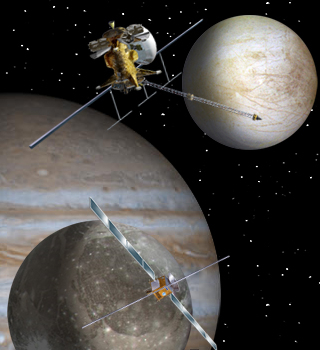
- Artist concept of the Europa Jupiter System Mission: Jupiter Europa Orbiter (top) and Jupiter Ganymede Orbiter (bottom).
- Mission type: Ganymede orbiter
- Operator: European Space Agency
- Website: sci.esa.int
- Mission duration: Cancelled

Spacecraft properties
- Launch mass: 957 kg (2,110 lb)

Start of mission
- Launch date: Proposed: NET 2020
- Rocket: Ariane 5
- Launch site: Kourou ELA-3

Orbital parameters
- Reference system: Ganymede orbit
- Semi-major axis: 200 km (120 mi)
- Inclination: 86°

Ganymede orbiter
- Orbital insertion: Proposed: 2025–2026

Jupiter Ganymede Orbiter (JGO) was a part of the international Europa Jupiter System Mission (EJSM). It was a proposed orbiter by the ESA slated for lift-off in 2020. Plans for the mission include detailed studies of Jupiter's moons, Ganymede and Callisto, as well as the Jovian magnetosphere.

It was superseded by the Jupiter Icy Moons Explorer in April 2012.

== See also ==
- Exploration of Jupiter
