= Jupiter Magnetospheric Orbiter =

Cancelled space probe proposed by the Japanese Aerospace Exploration Agency

- Operator: JAXA
- Mission duration: ≥9 years (proposed)

Start of mission
- Launch date: 2020 (cancelled)

Orbital parameters
- Reference system: Zenocentric
- Regime: Equatorial
- Inclination: 0°

Jupiter orbiter
- Orbital insertion: 2029 (proposed)

The Jupiter Magnetospheric Orbiter (木星磁気圏オービター, JMO) is a cancelled space probe proposed by the Japanese Aerospace Exploration Agency (JAXA), to undertake detailed in situ studies of the magnetosphere of Jupiter as a template for an astrophysical magnetised disk.

== History ==
The JMO was originally proposed in 2006 as the Japanese contribution to the now cancelled Europa Jupiter System Mission (EJSM). Then, it was proposed to be carried to Jupiter by the Jupiter and Trojan Asteroid Explorer (Trojan Asteroid Explorer).

The discussion for the international collaboration for a Jupiter mission between ESA and Japan (JAXA) started in 2006. By 2007, the orbiter was proposed for a lift-off in 2020 together with ESA's Jupiter Ganymede Orbiter (JGO) from which it would undock upon its arrival at Jupiter in 2025/2026. However, the EJSM collaboration was disbanded and NASA renamed its initiative with Europa Multiple-Flyby Mission, ESA's Jupiter Icy Moon Explorer, and Roscosmos's Laplace-P.

The JMO objective was to undertake detailed in situ studies of the magnetosphere of Jupiter as a template for an astrophysical magnetised disk for "3-point" investigations of the Jupiter system via synergistic observations with other orbiters. The size and weight of the JMO would have been limited to carry a payload up to 10 kg, equivalent to 2 to 3 scientific instruments. In order to conduct observations never made before, the spacecraft would have carried an X-ray imaging spectroscope, featuring different wavelengths from instruments onboard NASA's Juno probe.

In November 2013, Japan's JAXA scientists stated that ″it is difficult for JAXA to launch the outer planet mission by itself to meet the time constraint for cooperative observation with JUICE. Therefore, direct collaboration with European groups/team should be necessary for Japanese scientists to participate in this attractive Jupiter system mission.″ The outcome was the selection of four Japanese instrument development teams for 4 of the 10 Jupiter Icy Moon Explorer (JUICE) mission instruments.

== See also ==
- Magnetometer (Juno)
