= Jupiter Icy Moons Orbiter =

Canceled NASA orbiter mission to Jupiter's icy moons

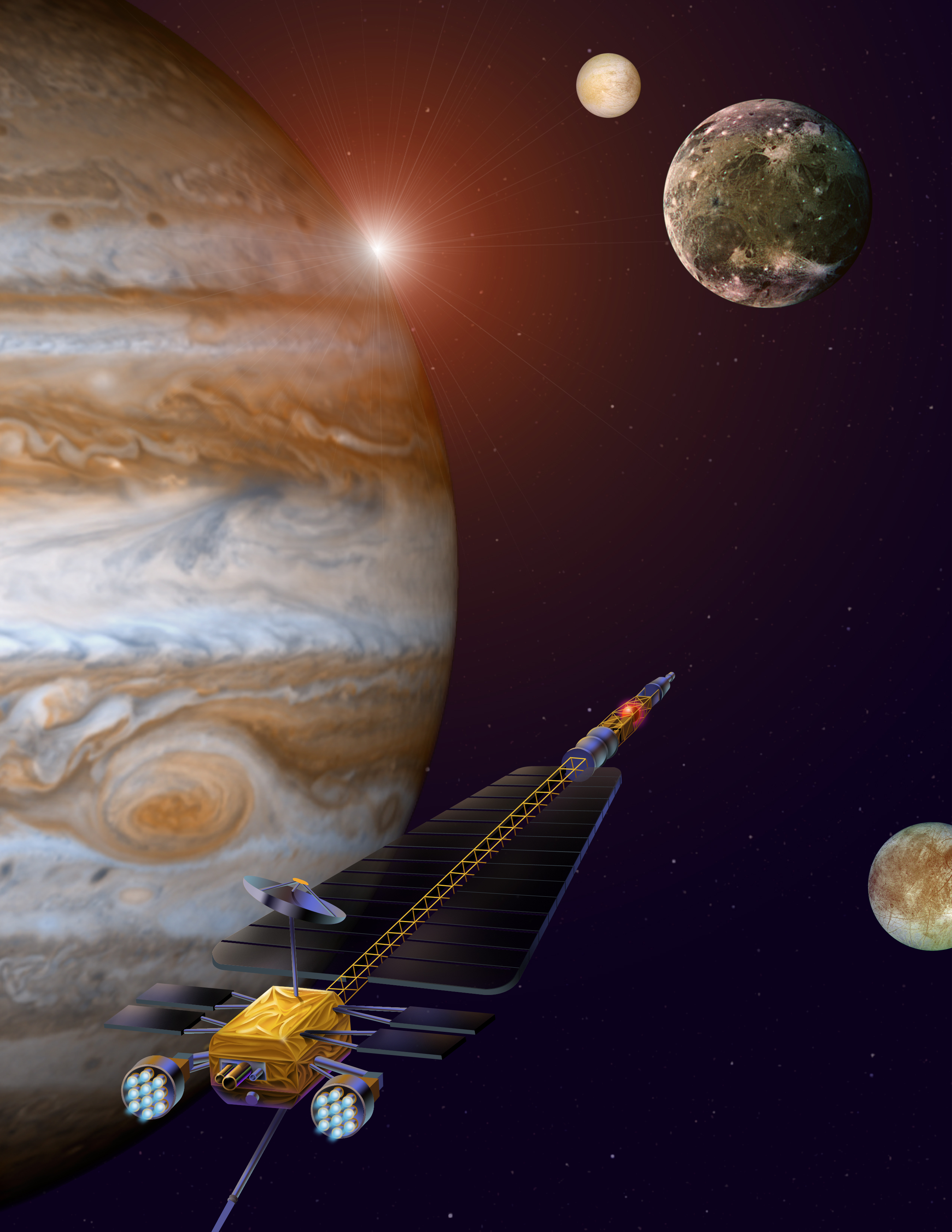
- Artist's conception of the JIMO spacecraft exploring Jupiter and its moons
- Names: JIMO
- Mission type: Jupiter orbiter
- Operator: NASA
- Mission duration: Cancelled

Spacecraft properties
- Manufacturer: Northrop Grumman
- Launch mass: Total (fully assembled): 36,375 kg (80,193 lb)
- Dry mass: Spacecraft module: 16,193 kg (35,699 lb); Reactor module: 6,182 kg (13,629 lb)
- Payload mass: 1,500 kg (3,300 lb)
- Dimensions: Fully deployed: 58.4 × 15.7 m (192 × 52 ft)
- Power: 200 kilowatts

Start of mission
- Launch date: NET May 2015 – January 2016; Planned
- Rocket: Delta IV Heavy; Baseline (2005)
- Launch site: Cape Canaveral SLC-37B

Jupiter orbiter
- Orbital insertion: April 2021; Planned
- Orbital departure: September 2025; Planned

Europa orbiter
- Orbital insertion: September 2025; Planned

Transponders
- Bandwidth: 10-Mbit/s
- TWTA power: 4 x 250 watts
- Large Strategic Science Missions; Planetary Science Division

The Jupiter Icy Moons Orbiter (JIMO) was a proposed NASA spacecraft designed to explore the icy moons of Jupiter. The main target was Europa, where an ocean of liquid water may harbor alien life. Ganymede and Callisto, which are now thought to also have liquid, salty oceans beneath their icy surfaces, were also targets of interest for the probe.

== The JIMO spacecraft ==
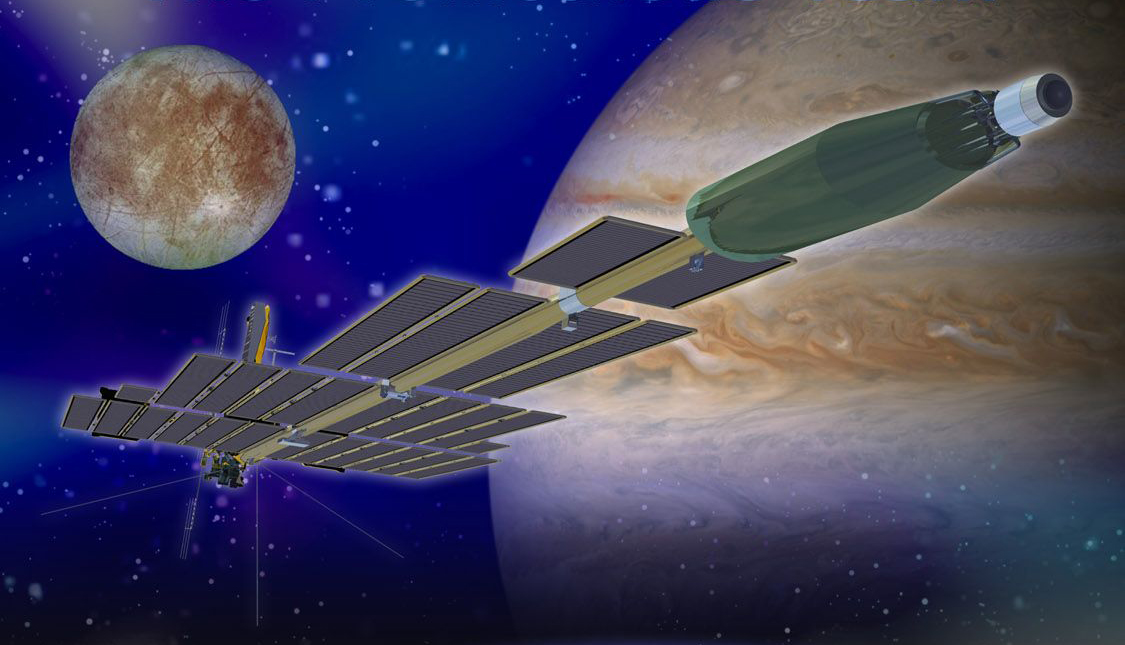
Forward view of JIMO

Throughout JIMO's main voyage to the Jupiter moons, it was to be propelled by an ion propulsion system via either the High Power Electric Propulsion or NEXIS engine, and powered by a small fission reactor. A Brayton power conversion system would convert reactor heat into electricity. Providing a thousand times the electrical output of conventional solar- or radioisotope thermoelectric generator (RTG)-based power systems, the reactor was expected to open up opportunities like flying a full scale ice-penetrating radar system and providing a strong, high-bandwidth data transmitter.

Using electric propulsion (8 ion engines, plus Hall thrusters of varying sizes) would make it possible to go into and leave orbits around the moons of Jupiter, creating more thorough observation and mapping windows than exist for current spacecraft, which must make short fly-by maneuvers because of limited fuel for maneuvering.

The design called for the reactor to be positioned in the tip of the spacecraft behind a strong radiation shield protecting sensitive spacecraft equipment. The reactor would only be powered up once the probe was well out of Earth orbit, so that the amount of radionuclides that would be launched into orbit is minimized. This configuration is thought to be less risky than the RTGs used on previous missions to the outer Solar System, because a reactor can be launched with minimally radioactive uranium fuel unlike an RTG whose fuel releases energy from spontaneous decay as opposed to chain-reaction triggered fission. Such a reactor's fuel's radioactivity would only be created by subsequent operation of the reactor.

The Europa Lander Mission proposed to include a small nuclear-powered Europa lander on JIMO. It would travel with the orbiter, which would also function as a communication relay to Earth. It would investigate Europa's habitability and assess its astrobiological potential by confirming the existence of water within and below Europa's icy shell, and determining its characteristics.

Northrop Grumman was selected on September 20, 2004 for a US$400 million preliminary design contract, beating Lockheed Martin and Boeing IDS. The contract was to have run through to 2008. Separate contracts, covering construction and individual instruments, were to be awarded at a later date.

== Preliminary design specifications ==
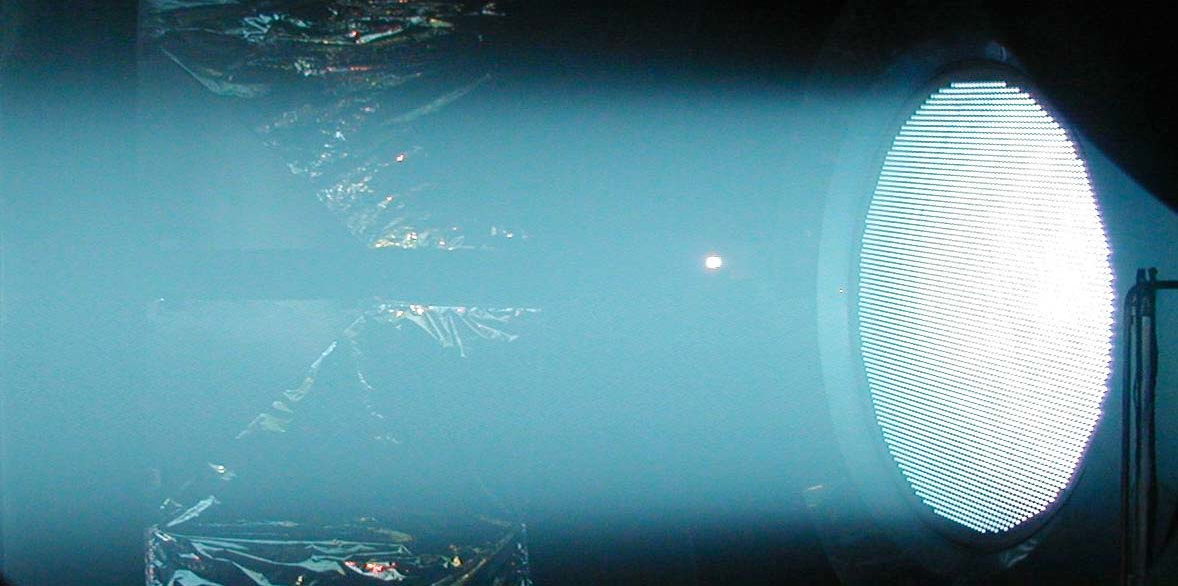
NEXIS ion engine test (2005)

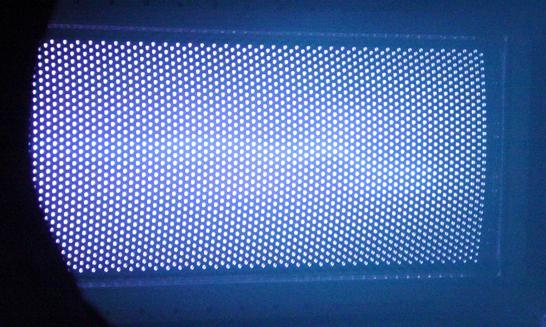
HiPEP ion engine test (2003)

- Gross mass in low Earth orbit: 36,375 kg
- Mass of xenon propellant: 12,000 kg
- Reactor module mass: 6,182 kg (200 kWe output)
- Spacecraft module dry mass: 16,193 kg
- Science payload mass: 1,500 kg
- Electric turboalternators: multiple 104 kW (440 V AC)
- Deployable radiator: 422 m^{2} surface area
- Electric Herakles ion thrusters: multiple 30 kW high efficiency, specific impulse 7,000 s (69 kN·s/kg)
- Hall thrusters: high power, higher thrust
- Telecommunications link: 10 Mbit/s (4×250 watt TWTA)
- Deployed size: 58.4 m long × 15.7 m wide
- Stowed size: 19.7 m long × 4.57 m wide
- Mission design life: 20 years
- Launch date: 2017
- Launch Vehicle: Delta IV Heavy
- Cost: 16 billion $ excluding launch

== Nuclear propulsion ==
The JIMO mission was to include a nuclear electric propulsion system named HiPEP with power provided by a small 200 kWe fission power system. The nuclear propulsion program was conducted from 2003 to 2005 by the Naval Reactors branch of the DOE.

The proposed system design was a gas-cooled reactor and Brayton power conversion to generate a peak output of 200 kilowatts of power.

== Mission profile ==
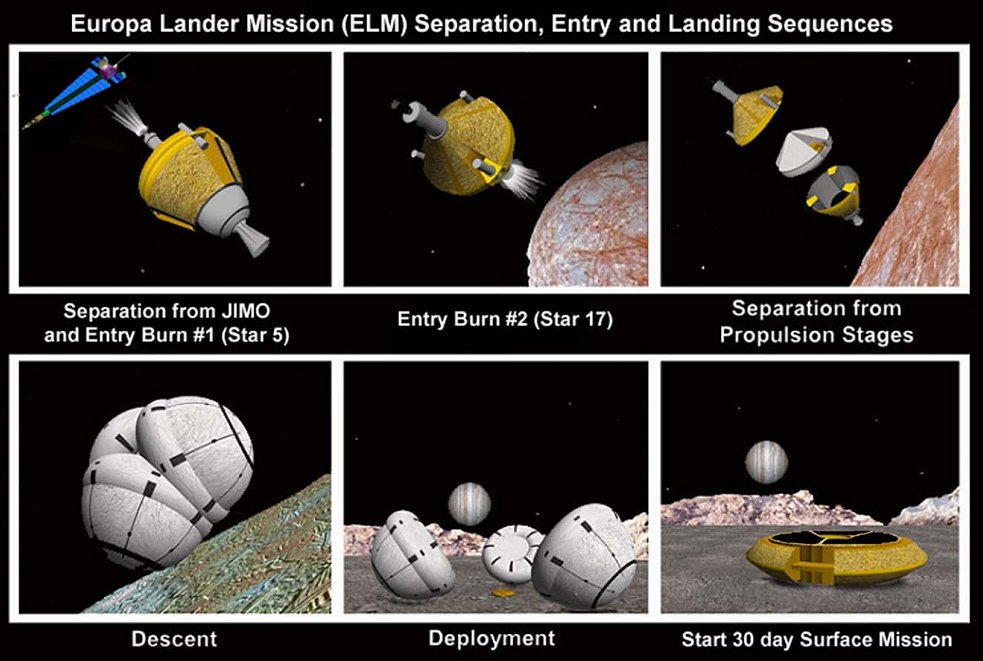
Europa Lander Mission concept circa 2005 (NASA)

Three launches were planned for May 2015 to low Earth orbit in order to assemble the two transfer stages and the probe. Transfer stages were designed to launch the probe on its trajectory to Jupiter during the launch window extending from late October 2015 to mid-January 2016.

During the first month of flight, the probe's main structures would be deployed, the nuclear reactor activated, and the thrusters tested. The interplanetary flight would have lasted until April 2021 (the ion engines were supposed to work two-thirds of the time).

Once the probe was in the influence area of Jupiter, the navigation would become more complex and difficult. The probe would have to use gravity assist manoeuvres to enter orbit.

The probe would have studied Callisto and then Ganymede for three months each, and finally Europa for one month (studies of Io were also planned when orbital conditions would have been favorable).

At the end of the mission in September 2025, the vehicle would have been parked in a stable orbit around Europa.

== Cancellation ==
Due to a shift in priorities at NASA that favored crewed space missions, the project lost funding in 2005, effectively cancelling the JIMO mission. Among other issues, the proposed nuclear technology was deemed too ambitious, as was the multiple-launch and in-orbit assembly mission architecture. Engineers at the Jet Propulsion Laboratory with JIMO were laid off or reassigned during the spring and summer of 2005.

As a result of the budget changes, NASA is instead considering a demonstration mission to a target closer to Earth to test out the reactor and heat rejection systems. The spacecraft would possibly be scaled down from its original size as well.

When it was cancelled, the JIMO mission was in an early planning stage and launch wasn't expected before 2017. It was to be the first proposed mission of NASA's Project Prometheus, a program for developing nuclear fission into a means of spacecraft propulsion.

=== Subsequent proposed replacements ===
After JIMO, NASA and ESA planned a joint mission to Jupiter's moons, the Europa Jupiter System Mission. This mission was also cancelled in 2011.

ESA has since continued to work separately on that design and on May 2, 2012 selected the Jupiter Icy Moon Explorer (JUICE) mission over two other ESA missions for funding. The JUICE mission will study the Jupiter moons Europa, Callisto and Ganymede and was launched as an ESA L-class mission on April 14, 2023 on an Ariane 5 carrier rocket.

In the late 2010s, the Europa Clipper became the main NASA mission to Europa with a significant difference in that it would be solar-powered and engage in multiple flybys of the moon rather than orbit it. Another similar mission is the Europa Lander, a proposed NASA astrobiology mission to Europa, to complement Europa Clipper. Europa Clipper was launched in 2024 and Europa Lander is planned to be launched in 2027.

== See also ==
- Europa Lander (NASA) (Independently launched lander follow on for Europa Clipper)
- Jupiter Icy Moon Explorer (later ESA planned Jupiter system probe)
