= Justices examination order =

A Justices Examination Order (JEO) is on order for psychiatric evaluation of an individual. The following information is relevant in the state of Queensland, Australia. Relevant procedures are defined in the Mental Health Act 2000.

Any person may request a JEO of any other person (even someone they do not know, but see acting in a manner that suggests mental illness). The applicant need not be over the age of 18. The Justice of the Peace must be convinced that the person is acting in a manner that suggests that they may be mentally ill, and that they will not willingly submit to a psychiatric examination. The JEO allows a mental health practitioner to enter the place of residence of the person and examine the person in question without their consent. If they believe that the person is mentally ill, the practitioner must approach a magistrate for an Involuntary Treatment Order (ITO). If the practitioner is refused entry to the premises, the JEO authorizes the police to assist the practitioner to forcibly enter the premises.

It is worthy of note that in an emergency (such as a suicide attempt) police and ambulance officers (amongst other people) can issue Emergency Examination Orders (EEOs) which are very similar to a JEO.
