= Jovian Europa Orbiter =

The Jovian Europa Orbiter (JEO) was a feasibility study by the European Space Agency for a mission to Jupiter's moon Europa. JEO would be capable of collecting information about Europa by orbiting it, and would have worked together with the Jovian Relay Spacecraft (JRS) and the Jovian Minisat Explorer (JME).

The Jovian Europa Orbiter was part of ESA's "Technology Reference Studies", which was superseded in 2007 by ESA's "Cosmic Vision", which includes the Europa Jupiter System Mission. EJSM was halted in 2011 due to funding issues at that time, which included several spacecraft, and ESA component of that stage was rebooted as Jupiter Icy Moons Explorer planned for the 2020s

Spacecraft of Jovian Minisat Explorer

- Jovian Relay Spacecraft
- Jovian Europa Orbiter
- Microprobe

The relay would allow keeping spaceflight hardware out of the intense radiation zones near Europa, but they would be launched and transit to Jupiter together.
