= Jupiter Europa Orbiter =

Cancelled NASA mission concept to Europa

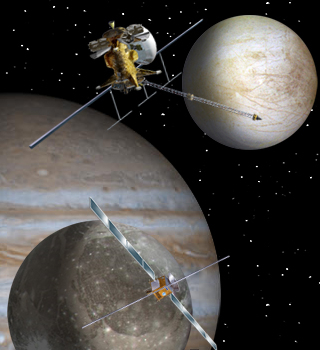
- Artist concept of the Europa Jupiter System Mission: Jupiter Europa Orbiter (top) and Jupiter Ganymede Orbiter (bottom).
- Mission type: Europa orbiter
- Operator: NASA
- Website: sci.esa.int
- Mission duration: Cancelled

Spacecraft properties
- Launch mass: 1,371 kg (3,023 lb)

Start of mission
- Launch date: 2020 (planned)
- Rocket: Delta IV Heavy or Atlas V

Orbital parameters
- Reference system: Europa orbit
- Inclination: 95°–100°

Europa orbiter
- Orbital insertion: 2026 (proposed)

As a part of the defunct Europa Jupiter System Mission – Laplace (EJSM-Laplace), the Jupiter Europa Orbiter (JEO) was a proposed orbiter probe slated for lift-off in 2020 and planned for detailed studies of Jupiter's moons Europa and Io as well as the Jovian magnetosphere. Its main goal would have been to look for evidence of a possible subsurface ocean.

In June 2015, a more economical mission, the Europa Multiple-Flyby Mission, renamed into Europa Clipper, was approved by NASA and entered the formulation stage.

== See also ==
- Europa Orbiter (former NASA plan cancelled in 2002).
- Europa Clipper (the next mission plan for Europa, non-nuclear orbiter for Jupiter doing Europa flybys).
- Europa Lander (NASA) (stand-alone mission for NASA Europa Lander) (Note: there was also a concept for a Europa Clipper add-on lander).
