= Europa Jupiter System Mission – Laplace =

Canceled orbiter mission concept to Jupiter

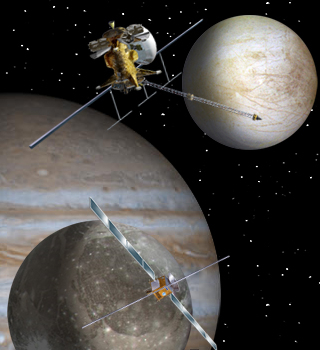
- Artist concept of the Europa Jupiter System Mission: Jupiter Europa Orbiter (top) and Jupiter Ganymede Orbiter (bottom).
- Mission type: Jupiter exploration
- Operator: NASA / ESA
- Mission duration: Cancelled

Spacecraft properties
- Launch mass: Jupiter Europa Orbiter; 1,371 kg (3,023 lb); Jupiter Ganymede Orbiter; 957 kg (2,110 lb)

Start of mission
- Launch date: 2020
- Rocket: Jupiter Europa Orbiter; Delta IV Heavy; Jupiter Ganymede Orbiter; Ariane 5

Europa orbiter
- Spacecraft component: Jupiter Europa Orbiter
- Orbital insertion: 2026 (proposed)

Ganymede orbiter
- Spacecraft component: Jupiter Ganymede Orbiter
- Orbital insertion: 2025–2026 (proposed)
- Large Strategic Science Missions; Planetary Science Division

The Europa Jupiter System Mission – Laplace (EJSM-Laplace) was a proposed joint NASA/ESA uncrewed space mission slated to launch around 2020 for the in-depth exploration of Jupiter's moons with a focus on Europa, Ganymede and Jupiter's magnetosphere. The mission would have comprised at least two independent elements, NASA's Jupiter Europa Orbiter (JEO) and ESA's Jupiter Ganymede Orbiter (JGO), to perform coordinated studies of the Jovian system.

The Japan Aerospace Exploration Agency (JAXA) and Russia’s space agency Roscosmos had expressed their interest in contributing to EJSM-Laplace, although no deals had been finalized. JEO was estimated to cost US$4.7 billion, while ESA would spend US$1.0 billion (€710 million) on JGO.

In April 2011, European Space Agency (ESA) stated that it seemed unlikely that a joint US–European mission will happen in the early 2020s given NASA's budget, so ESA continued with its initiative, called the Jupiter Icy Moons Explorer (JUICE) that will be based on the JGO design. Selection of JUICE for the L1 launch slot of ESA's Cosmic Vision science programme was announced on 2 May 2012. JUICE was launched on 14 April 2023.

Later, in June 2015, NASA approved the Europa Clipper, which was launched on 14 October 2024.

== Origins ==
In February 2008, NASA and ESA began joint investigations into sending a probe to study the icy satellites of the outer Solar System under the title Outer Planet Flagship Mission. Two primary candidate missions were considered under the study: EJSM and Titan Saturn System Mission (TSSM), also known under the ESA designation TandEM.

In February 2009, it was announced that NASA/ESA had given EJSM priority ahead of the TSSM. The ESA contribution still faced funding competition from two other missions, the Laser Interferometer Space Antenna (LISA) and the International X-ray Observatory (IXO), which is why NASA kept a contingency plan of sending its part of the mission as a stand-alone project.

== Mission architecture ==
A map showing all the nations, which were either currently part of (red) or interested in becoming a part of (brown) the EJSM

The most distinctive feature of the EJSM/Laplace-study, was the proposed collaboration with multiple orbiters and landers:

- (United States) NASA: Jupiter Europa Orbiter (JEO), proposed to study Europa and Io.
- (Europe) ESA: Jupiter Ganymede Orbiter (JGO), proposed to study Ganymede and Callisto
- (Japan) JAXA: Jupiter Magnetospheric Orbiter (JMO), proposed to study Jupiter's magnetosphere.
- (Japan) JAXA: Jupiter and Trojan Asteroid Explorer (JTAX), proposed to study a Jupiter trojan.

The baseline EJSM architecture consisted of JEO and JGO, which were proposed to be launched in 2020 and explore the Jupiter System before settling into orbit around Europa and Ganymede, respectively. The JEO and JGO were separate and independent spacecraft developed, launched and operated by their respective organizations to work together. Their launch dates and interplanetary trajectories were not to be dependent on each other, but would have been synergistic.

=== Goal ===
The goal was to determine whether the Jupiter system harbors habitable environments, while focusing on Europa and Ganymede. The main science objectives supporting this goal were:

- Characterize sub-surface oceans
- Characterize the ice shells and any subsurface water
- Characterize the deep internal structure for Ganymede and the intrinsic magnetic field
- Compare the exospheres, plasma environments, and magnetospheric interactions.
- Determine global surface compositions and chemistry
- Understand the formation of surface features, including sites of recent or current activity, and identify and characterize candidate sites for future in situ exploration.
