= List of proposed missions to the outer planets =

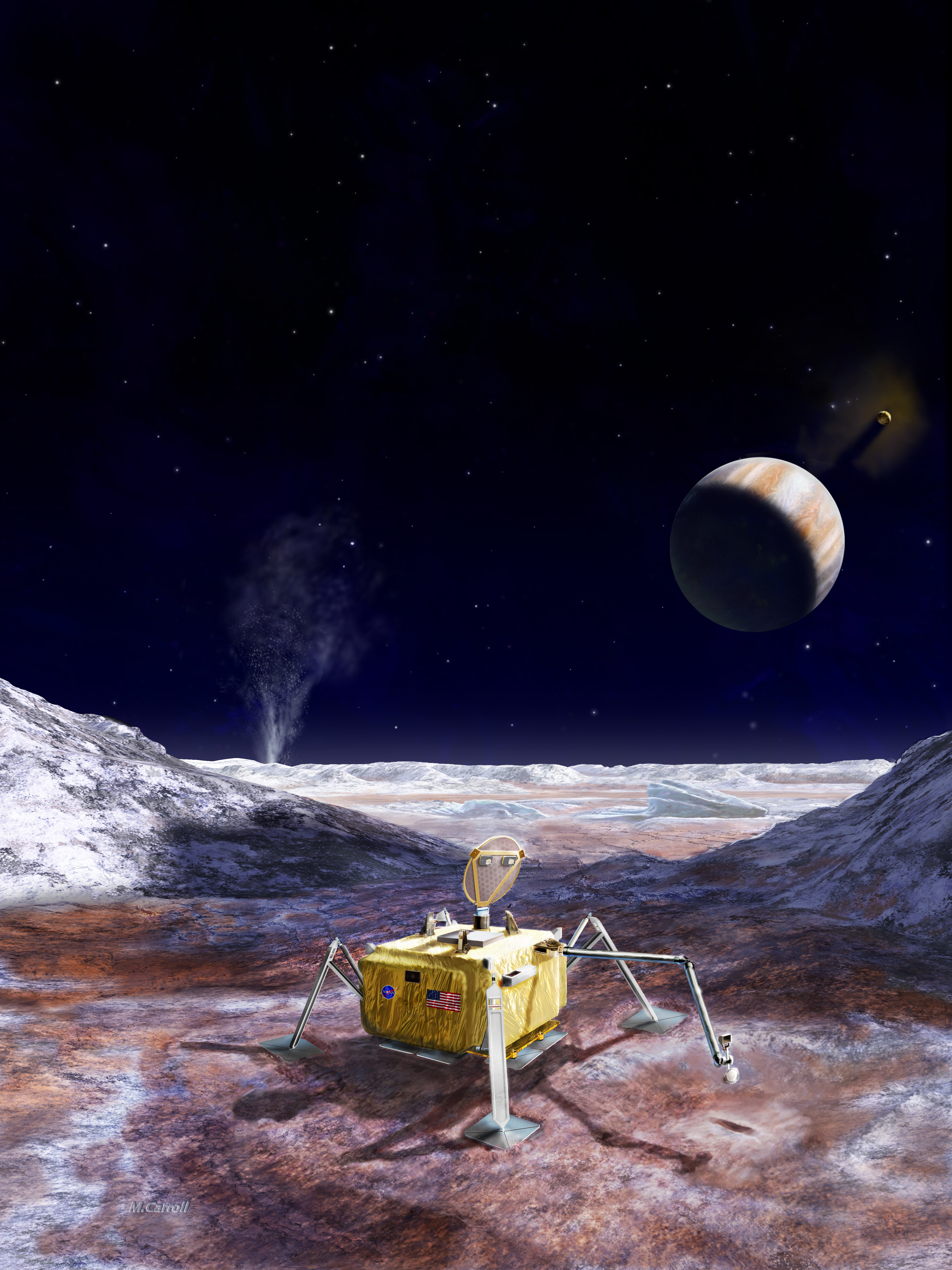
Artist's concept of the proposed Europa Lander mission.

The list of proposed missions to the outer planets is a listing of concept studies for an uncrewed or crewed mission to the gas giants. Proposed missions to gas giants are typically based on engineering and scientific assessments of technological capabilities at the time of study. These proposals are usually associated with high-budget space agencies like NASA. Mission profiles may include strategies such as flybys, landers, or other types of system encounters aimed at exploring a gas giant and its moons. The missions that were launched can be found in the list of missions to the outer planets.

== History ==
In February 1969, NASA approved two spacecraft missions under the Pioneer program, managed by Ames Research Center (ARC), to explore Jupiter. In 1970, NASA granted a contract to the TRW Company of Redondo Beach, California, to construct the spacecraft. NASA initially directed the TRW Company to develop the Pioneer spacecraft to ensure that future missions could withstand the intense radiation belts of Jupiter. Each spacecraft was equipped with 11 instruments to conduct close-up studies of Jupiter and interplanetary space during transit. Pioneer 10 was launched in 1972 from Cape Canaveral Launch Complex 36A, with the goal of exploring Jupiter, its moons, magnetic field, and radiation belts. During its closest approach on 3 December, it passed within 82,178 mi (132,253 km) of Jupiter, collecting data on the planet and its moons, ultimately transmitting over 500 images by 2 January 1974.

In 1973, Pioneer 11 launched from Cape Canaveral Launch Complex 36B as a backup to the Pioneer 10 spacecraft. By May 1974, the mission trajectory was adjusted to include a gravity assist from Jupiter, redirecting it toward Saturn. On 2 December 1974, Pioneer 11 made a close flyby of Jupiter, passing beneath the planet's southern pole before being propelled toward Saturn through its northern pole. On 1 September 1979, Pioneer 11 passed within 13,000 mi (21,000 km) of Saturn's cloud tops.

An animation of a sequence of images taken by the Voyager 1 probe of the planet Jupiter. One frame was taken every Jupiter day, about 10 hours, from 6 January 1979 to 3 February 1979, giving 66 frames in all.

In August 1977, Voyager 2 launched from Cape Canaveral Space Force Station to explore Jupiter, Saturn, Uranus, and Neptune during a rare 175-year planetary alignment. The following month, Voyager 1 was launched from the same location.

In March 1979, Voyager 1 made its close approach to Jupiter, capturing detailed images of the planet and its moons, with Voyager 2 conducting its flyby four months later. In November 1980, Voyager 1 flew by Saturn, using a gravity assist to explore Titan before traveling north out of the ecliptic plane.

Voyager 2 followed with its own Saturn flyby nine months later, in August 1981, using a gravity assist to set a course for Uranus. In January 1986, Voyager 2 became the first spacecraft to visit Uranus, discovering 10 new moons, 2 new rings, and revealing a magnetic field that was both tilted 55 degrees off its axis and off-center from the planet's core. In August 1989, Voyager 2 conducted its final flyby of a planet, passing by Neptune and its moon Triton, revealing its active geology, including geysers of nitrogen gas. The gravity assist from Neptune sent Voyager 2 traveling south of the ecliptic plane.

In October 1989, the Galileo spacecraft was launched from Kennedy Space Center's Complex 39B. Designed to study Jupiter, its moons, and its surrounding environment, Galileo was the first spacecraft to orbit an outer planet. The mission also included encounters with the asteroids 951 Gaspra and 243 Ida. On 7 December 1995, the Galileo spacecraft reached Jupiter after gravitational assist flybys of Venus and Earth. After eight years in Jupiter's orbit, Galileo was intentionally destroyed in Jupiter's atmosphere on 21 September 2003, to avoid contaminating potentially habitable moons. The next orbiter to visit Jupiter was NASA's Juno, which arrived on 5 July 2016.

In October 1990, the Ulysses spacecraft was launched from Kennedy Space Center's Complex 39B on a mission to study the Sun at all latitudes. To accomplish this, Ulysses needed to achieve an orbital inclination of about 80°, which required a significant change in heliocentric velocity. Since the energy required for this inclination change was beyond the capabilities of any available launch vehicle, mission planners used a gravity assist from Jupiter. In February 1992, Ulysses passed close to Jupiter, utilizing its gravity to alter its trajectory and propel it into a high-inclination orbit around the Sun. This enabled the spacecraft to study the Sun's polar regions. Given its distance from the Sun during the mission, Ulysses could not rely on solar panels for power. Instead, it was equipped with a General Purpose Heat Source Radioisotope Thermoelectric Generator (RTG).

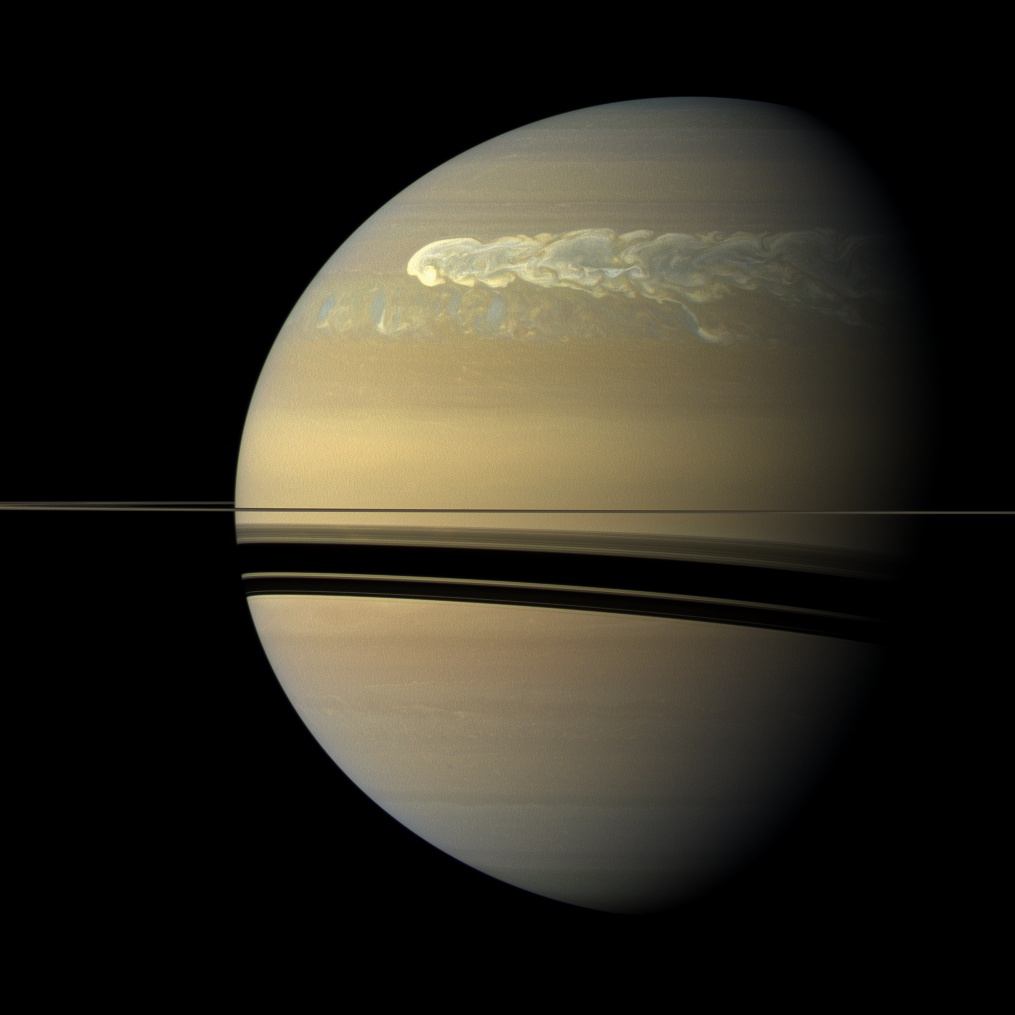
The Great White Spot as seen in Saturn's northern hemisphere in 2011.

In October 1997, the Cassini–Huygens spacecraft was launched from Cape Canaveral Space Launch Complex 40. The mission was designed to study Saturn and its system, including its rings and moons. The Flagship-class robotic spacecraft consisted of NASA's Cassini orbiter and ESA's Huygens lander, which landed on Saturn's largest moon, Titan. Cassini became the fourth space probe to visit Saturn and the first to enter its orbit, where it operated from 2004 to 2017. The spacecraft's journey to Saturn included flybys of Venus in April 1998 and June 1999, Earth in August 1999, the asteroid 2685 Masursky, and Jupiter in December 2000. Cassini entered Saturn's orbit on 1 July 2004. The mission concluded on 15 September 2017, when Cassini was deliberately sent into Saturn's upper atmosphere to burn up, ensuring that Saturn's moons, which may harbor habitable environments, would not be contaminated.

In January 2006, the New Horizons spacecraft was launched from Cape Canaveral Space Launch Complex 41 on a mission to visit Pluto. To accelerate toward its target, the spacecraft used an Earth-and-solar escape trajectory, achieving a speed of approximately 16.26 km/s (10.10 mi/s; 58,500 km/h; 36,400 mph), and later performed a gravity assist flyby of Jupiter. Before reaching Jupiter, New Horizons had a brief encounter with the asteroid 132524 APL. New Horizons made its closest approach to Jupiter on 28 February 2007, at a distance of 2.3 million kilometers (1.4 million miles). The gravity assist from Jupiter increased the spacecraft's speed and allowed it to continue on its trajectory toward Pluto. The flyby also served as a comprehensive test of New Horizons' scientific instruments, returning valuable data on Jupiter's atmosphere, moons, and magnetosphere. On 14 July 2015, at 11:49 UTC, New Horizons flew 12,500 km (7,800 mi) above Pluto's surface, which at the time was 34 AU from the Sun.

In August 2011, the Juno spacecraft was launched from Cape Canaveral Space Force Station Space Launch Complex 41 on a mission to study Jupiter. Juno spent five years traveling to Jupiter, accomplishing a gravity assist from Earth in October 2013. Upon arrival at Jupiter, the spacecraft performed an orbit insertion burn, reducing its speed to be captured by the planet's gravity. The mission was originally scheduled to conclude in February 2018 after completing 37 orbits of Jupiter. However, the mission was extended through 2025 to conduct 42 additional orbits, including close flybys of Jupiter's moons Ganymede, Europa, and Io. At the end of its mission, Juno is planned to be deorbited and burned up in Jupiter's outer atmosphere to suppress the risk of biological contamination of its moons.

In October 2021, the Lucy spacecraft was launched from Cape Canaveral Space Force Station Space Launch Complex 41 on a mission to study eight different asteroids, including two main-belt asteroids and six Jupiter trojans. The spacecraft performed its first Earth gravity assist on 16 October 2022. In 2023, Lucy flew by the asteroid 152830 Dinkinesh, and conducted a second gravity assist from Earth in 2024. In 2025, it flew past the inner main-belt asteroid 52246 Donaldjohanson. In 2027, Lucy is scheduled to reach the L_{4} Trojan cloud and conduct flybys of four Trojans: 3548 Eurybates and its satellite, 15094 Polymele, 11351 Leucus, and 21900 Orus. After these encounters, the spacecraft will return to Earth in 2031 for another gravity assist, which will send it toward the L_{5} Trojan cloud. In 2033, Lucy is scheduled to fly by the binary Trojan 617 Patroclus and its satellite Menoetius. The mission is expected to conclude with the Patroclus–Menoetius flyby, but at that point, Lucy will remain in a stable, six-year orbit between the L4 and L5 Trojan clouds, leaving the possibility open for a mission extension.

As of December 2024, two spacecraft are en route to Jupiter: the Jupiter Icy Moons Explorer (JUICE) and the Europa Clipper. Both missions aim to study Jupiter and its moons, with JUICE focusing on Ganymede, Callisto, and Europa, and the Europa Clipper specifically targeting Europa's potential habitability.

== Jupiter ==
Eight spacecraft have been launched to explore Jupiter, along with two others completing gravity-assist flybys.

Mission		Spacecraft	Launch date	Carrier rocket	Operator	Mission Type	Outcome
1	Argo	Argo	c. 2020s	N/A	(United States) NASA	Flyby	Not selected
1	Argo	Cancelled due to shortage of plutonium-238 required for the radioisotope thermoelectric generators (RTG). Proposed to have used a Jupiter gravity assist to propel it toward Saturn.					
2	BRUIE	Buoyant Rover for Under-Ice Exploration	N/A	N/A	(United States) NASA	Lander	Not selected
2	BRUIE	Currently in progress, with potential plans to explore Europa and Enceladus.					
3	Europa Jupiter System Mission - Laplace	Europa Jupiter System Mission - Laplace	circa 2020	N/A	(European Union) (United States) ESA/NASA	Orbiter	Not selected
3	Europa Jupiter System Mission - Laplace	Joint NASA-ESA mission including NASA-led JEO and ESA-led JGO components.					
3	Europa Lander	Europa Lander	2025–2030	Space Launch System or a commercial rocket	(United States) NASA	Lander	Not selected
3	Europa Lander	Would depend on the Europa Clipper to select a landing site and assess radiation levels. Once landed, it would search for biosignatures and authenticate and determine the proximity of liquid water.					
5	Europa Orbiter	Europa Orbiter	2003	Space Shuttle	(United States) NASA	Orbiter	Not selected
5	Europa Orbiter	Canceled in 2002 due to concerns over extreme radiation levels near Jupiter. Would have determined the presence of a subsurface ocean and identified potential sites for future lander missions.					
6	Jovian Europa Orbiter	Jovian Europa Orbiter	N/A	N/A	(European Union) ESA	Orbiter	Not selected
6	Jovian Europa Orbiter	Cancelled and superseded by EJSM.					
7	Flyby of Io with Repeat Encounters	Flyby of Io with Repeat Encounters	2024	Atlas V	(United States) NASA	Orbiter	Not selected
7	Flyby of Io with Repeat Encounters	Would use three gravity assists to reach Jupiter in six years, orbit the planet, and conduct 10 close flybys of Io, some at altitudes as low as 100 km (62 mi).					
8	Innovative Interstellar Explorer	Innovative Interstellar Explorer	c. 2014	Delta IV Heavy with a stack of Star 48 and Star 37 or the Atlas V 551 with a Star 48.	(United States) NASA	Flyby	Not selected
8	Innovative Interstellar Explorer	Cancelled due to missed launch windows and unavailable materials. Planned to use a Jupiter gravity assist to reach interstellar space and study magnetic fields, cosmic rays, and their effects on a spacecraft exiting the Solar System.					
9	Interstellar Probe	Interstellar Probe	Between 2036 and 2041	Space Launch System Block 2	(United States) NASA	Flyby	Proposed
9	Interstellar Probe	Designed to explore and study the heliosphere and interstellar space, using a Jupiter gravity assist to increase its speed, after which the probe would travel at approximately 6–7 AU (560,000,000–650,000,000 mi; 900,000,000–1.05×10^{9} km) per year, exiting the heliosphere within 16 years.					
10	Io Volcano Observer	Io Volcano Observer	January 2029	N/A	(United States) NASA	Flyby	Not selected
10	Io Volcano Observer	Designed to study tidal heating as a key planetary process, investigating where and how it is generated within Io, how it reaches the surface, and how Io evolves over time.					
11	Jupiter Europa Orbiter	Jupiter Europa Orbiter	2020	Delta IV Heavy or Atlas V	(United States) NASA	Orbiter	Not selected
11	Jupiter Europa Orbiter	Canceled after NASA approved the Europa Clipper mission. It was intended to study Europa, Io, and Jupiter's magnetosphere.					
12	Jupiter Ganymede Orbiter	Jupiter Ganymede Orbiter	2020	Ariane 5	(European Union) ESA	Orbiter	Not selected
12	Jupiter Ganymede Orbiter	Canceled after being superseded by the Jupiter Icy Moons Explorer mission in a vote. It was intended to study Ganymede, Callisto, and Jupiter's magnetosphere.					
13	Jupiter Icy Moons Orbiter	Jupiter Icy Moons Orbiter	May 2015 – January 2016	Delta IV Heavy Baseline	(United States) NASA	Orbiter	Not selected
13	Jupiter Icy Moons Orbiter	Canceled due to a shift in NASA's priorities, which favored crewed space missions instead. The probe would have confirmed the potential existence of a subsurface ocean beneath Europa's surface, with Ganymede and Callisto also being targeted for exploration.					
14	Jupiter Magnetospheric Orbiter	Jupiter Magnetospheric Orbiter	2020	N/A	(Japan) JAXA	Orbiter	Not selected
14	Jupiter Magnetospheric Orbiter	Canceled due to JAXA's inability to launch the mission in time for cooperative observation with JUICE. It would have studied Jupiter's magnetosphere as a model for an astrophysical magnetized disk.					
15	Laplace-P	Laplace-P	2026	Angara A5 with the KVTK upper stage	(Russia) Roscosmos	Lander	Not selected
15	Laplace-P	Canceled in 2017 due to funding issues. It was designed to study the Jovian moon system and include a lander for Ganymede exploration.					
16	New Horizons 2	New Horizons 2	N/A	N/A	(United States) NASA	Flyby	Not selected
16	New Horizons 2	Cancelled due to shortage of plutonium-238 required for the radioisotope thermoelectric generators (RTG). The mission would have used a Jupiter gravity assist and a Uranus flyby to reach and explore Kuiper belt objects.					
17	OKEANOS	Oversize Kite-craft for Exploration and Astronautics in the Outer Solar system	2026	H-IIA or H3	(Japan) JAXA	Flyby	Not selected
17	OKEANOS	Cancelled after being superseded by LiteBIRD in a vote. Would have studied Jupiter's Trojan asteroids using a hybrid solar sail for propulsion.					
18	Pioneer H	Pioneer H	1974	N/A	(United States) NASA	Flyby	Not selected
18	Pioneer H	Cancelled as the mission proposal was never accepted by NASA. It would have flown by Jupiter as a third Pioneer probe alongside Pioneer 10 and 11. The spacecraft now resides in the National Air and Space Museum in Washington, D.C.					
19	Shensuo	Shensuo	May 2024	N/A	(China) CNSA	Flyby	Proposed
19	Shensuo	The IHP-1 and IHP-2 missions will use Jupiter gravity assists to accelerate into interstellar space. Once there, they will study anomalous cosmic rays, interplanetary dust, and the interstellar medium.					
20	SMARA	SMARA	N/A	N/A	(European Union) ESA	Entry probe	Not selected
20	SMARA	Microprobes proposed to launch with the Jupiter Icy Moons Explorer, designed to study Jupiter's atmosphere and capture photographs during descent.					
21	Tianwen-4	Tianwen-4	September 2029	Long March 5	(China) CNSA	Orbiter	Planned
21	Tianwen-4	Will investigate magnetic field interactions with plasma in the Jovian system, analyze atmospheric composition, study the internal structures and surfaces of Ganymede or Callisto, and examine the space environment around the Galilean moons.					
22	Trident	Trident	25 October 2025 with a backup in October 2026	N/A	(United States) NASA	Flyby	Not selected
22	Trident	Proposed mission to study Triton's surface and cryovolcanism, using a Jupiter gravity assist and a flyby of Io in 2032 to accelerate toward Neptune.					
23	Tsiolkovsky mission	Tsiolkovsky mission	c. 1990s	N/A	(Soviet Union) Soviet space program	Flyby	Cancelled
23	Tsiolkovsky mission	Proposed mission to use a Jupiter gravity assist to approach within five to seven solar radii to study the Sun, with a derivative spacecraft potentially targeting Saturn and beyond.					

== Saturn ==
One spacecraft has been launched to orbit Saturn, along with three others completing gravity-assist flybys.

Mission		Spacecraft	Launch date	Carrier rocket	Operator	Mission Type	Outcome
1	AVIATR	Aerial Vehicle for In situ and Airborne Titan Reconnaissance	2020	Atlas V 521	(United States) NASA	Lander	Not selected
1	AVIATR	Cancelled as the National Research Council's “Decadal Survey” did not prioritize Titan exploration, and development of the advanced Stirling radioisotope generator was halted. The mission proposed an airplane concept for exploring Saturn's moon Titan.					
2	Breakthrough Enceladus mission	Breakthrough Enceladus mission	N/A	N/A	(United States) Breakthrough Initiatives	Orbiter	Proposed
2	Breakthrough Enceladus mission	Proposed to search for life on Saturn's moon Enceladus by detecting microbes in its water plumes and using ice-penetrating radar to study the moon's subsurface ocean.					
3	Dragonfly	Dragonfly	5–25 July 2028	Falcon Heavy	(United States) NASA	Lander	Planned
3	Dragonfly	Part of the New Frontiers program, the mission will deploy a robotic rotorcraft to Saturn's moon Titan to evaluate its potential for microbial habitability and investigate its prebiotic chemistry across multiple sites.					
4	Enceladus Explorer	Enceladus Explorer	N/A	N/A	(Germany) German Aerospace Center and seven German universities	Orbiter and lander	Not selected
4	Enceladus Explorer	Funded by the German Aerospace Center, the mission is a research collaboration among seven German universities. It includes a lander equipped with the IceMole probe and an orbiter designed primarily to serve as a communications relay between the lander and Earth.					
5	Enceladus Icy Jet Analyzer	Enceladus Icy Jet Analyzer	N/A	N/A	(United States) NASA	Orbiter	Not selected
5	Enceladus Icy Jet Analyzer	Proposed time-of-flight mass spectrometer mission designed to detect prebiotic molecules, such as amino acids, and biosignatures in the plumes of Saturn's moon Enceladus.					
6	Enceladus Life Finder	Enceladus Life Finder	N/A	N/A	(United States) NASA	Orbiter	Not selected
6	Enceladus Life Finder	Designed to evaluate the habitability of Enceladus's subsurface ocean.					
7	Enceladus Life Signatures and Habitability	Enceladus Life Signatures and Habitability	N/A	N/A	(United States) NASA	Orbiter	Not selected
7	Enceladus Life Signatures and Habitability	Proposed to search for biosignatures and assess Enceladus's habitability.					
8	Enceladus Orbilander	Enceladus Orbilander	October 2038	Space Launch System Block 2	(United States) NASA	Orbiter and lander	Proposed
8	Enceladus Orbilander	Planned to orbit Enceladus for 18 months to sample its water plumes, followed by a two-year surface mission to analyze materials for signs of life.					
9	Explorer of Enceladus and Titan	Explorer of Enceladus and Titan	N/A	N/A	(European Union) (United States) ESA/NASA	Orbiter	Not selected
9	Explorer of Enceladus and Titan	Proposed to study the origin and evolution of volatile-rich icy worlds by examining Enceladus and Titan, assess their habitability and potential for life, and explore Titan as an Earth-like world with a dynamic climate and landscape.					
10	Journey to Enceladus and Titan	Journey to Enceladus and Titan	N/A	N/A	(United States) NASA	Orbiter	Not selected
10	Journey to Enceladus and Titan	Cancelled after being superseded by Lucy in a vote. The mission aimed to conduct high-resolution mass spectroscopy mapping to analyze the processes shaping Saturn's moons, while assessing the habitability potential of Enceladus and Titan.					
11	Kronos	Kronos	N/A	N/A	(European Union) (United States) ESA/NASA	Orbiter	Not selected
11	Kronos	Proposed to analyze Saturn's atmospheric composition, gravity, and magnetic fields, with two atmospheric probes aiding in close-up imaging of its rings.					
12	L4	Unnamed mission	2042	N/A	(Europe) ESA	Orbiter and lander	Proposed
12	L4	In 2024, ESA named a mission to Enceladus its top priority for a large mission. Currently known as L4, it is proposed to include an orbiter and a lander.					
13	Life Investigation For Enceladus	Life Investigation For Enceladus	Late 2021	N/A	(United States) NASA	Orbiter	Not selected
13	Life Investigation For Enceladus	Proposes sending a robotic spacecraft to collect particles from Saturn's moon Enceladus and return them to Earth for detailed analysis, searching for biomolecules and potential signs of life.					
14	Moonraker	Moonraker	N/A	N/A	(Europe) ESA	Flyby	Not selected
14	Moonraker	Concept study of a flyby mission to study Enceladus in search for habitability.					
15	Oceanus	Oceanus	February 2024	N/A	(United States) NASA	Orbiter	Not selected
15	Oceanus	Cancelled as it was not selected for development under the New Frontiers program. Proposed to travel to Saturn's moon Titan to evaluate its habitability.					
16	Saturn Atmospheric Entry Probe	Saturn Atmospheric Entry Probe	30 August 2027	N/A	(United States) NASA	Entry probe	Not selected
16	Saturn Atmospheric Entry Probe	Proposes robotic spacecraft designed to deploy a single probe into Saturn's atmosphere for in-depth study.					
17	SPRITE	Saturn PRobe Interior and aTmospheric Explorer	November 2024	Atlas V 401	(United States) NASA	Entry probe	Not selected
17	SPRITE	Canceled after not being selected for development under the New Frontiers program. The probe would have been an atmospheric entry probe designed to travel independently to Saturn, enter its atmosphere, and collect in situ measurements during descent.					
18	THEO	Testing the Habitability of Enceladus's Ocean	TBD	N/A	(United States) NASA	Orbiter	Not selected
18	THEO	Evaluates ocean habitability of Enceladus.					
19	Tiger	Tiger	N/A	N/A	(United States) NASA	Flyby	Not selected
19	Tiger	Concept study of a flyby mission to study Enceladus's plumes in search for habitability.					
20	Titan Lake In-situ Sampling Propelled Explorer	Titan Lake In-situ Sampling Propelled Explorer	N/A	N/A	(Spain) (European Union) CAB/SENER/ESA	Lander	Not selected
20	Titan Lake In-situ Sampling Propelled Explorer	The mission proposed landing on Ligeia Mare to navigate the lake for 6–12 months. If approved by ESA, it would study the liquid hydrocarbon sea, perform scientific measurements, and explore the surrounding terrain and northern coast of Titan.					
21	Titan Mare Explorer	Titan Mare Explorer	2016	Atlas V 411	(United States) NASA	Lander	Not selected
21	Titan Mare Explorer	The mission aimed to measure Titan's organic constituents, conduct the first nautical exploration of an extraterrestrial sea, analyze its composition, and potentially study its shoreline.					
22	Titan Saturn System Mission	Titan Saturn System Mission	Between 2020 and 2029	Delta IV Heavy, Space Launch System Block IB, or Atlas V	(United States) NASA	Orbiter and lander	Not selected
22	Titan Saturn System Mission	Canceled due to funding constraints and prioritization of other planetary exploration goals. The mission aimed to study Saturn's moons Titan and Enceladus, focusing on their atmospheres, surfaces, and potential signs of life.					
23	Titan Submarine	Titan Submarine	2030s-2040s	N/A	(United States) NASA	Lander	Not selected
23	Titan Submarine	Proposed to detect the elemental and chemical properties of Titan's water, undersea rocks, and minerals, as well as identify undersea seismic activity. The submarine would also measure the depth and temperature of specific locations within Titan's lakes.					
24	Titan Winged Aerobot	Titan Winged Aerobot	N/A	N/A	(United States) NASA	Orbiter	Not selected
24	Titan Winged Aerobot	Proposed aerobot designed to fly through Titan's atmosphere, analyzing its composition and measuring temperature variations.					
25	Unnamed mission	Unnamed spacecraft	N/A	N/A	(China) CNSA	Orbiter and lander	Proposed
25	Unnamed mission	Proposed to include an orbiter, a lander, and a deep-drilling robot.					

== Uranus ==
Voyager 2 is the only spacecraft to visit Uranus, conducting a single flyby during its grand tour of the outer planets.

Mission		Spacecraft	Launch date	Carrier rocket	Operator	Mission Type	Outcome
1	HORUS	Herschel Orbital Reconnaissance of the Uranian System	N/A	N/A	(United States) NASA	Orbiter	Not selected
1	HORUS	Proposed Uranus system reconnaissance mission.					
2	MUSE	MUSE	September 2026, November 2029 if delayed	Ariane 6	(European Union) ESA	Orbiter	Not selected
2	MUSE	Proposed to investigate Uranus's atmosphere, interior, moons, rings, and magnetosphere, including deploying an atmospheric probe to study why Uranus emits minimal heat.					
3	OCEANUS	Origins and Composition of the Exoplanet Analog Uranus System	2030	Atlas V 511 or SLS	(United States) NASA	Orbiter	Not selected
3	OCEANUS	Proposed to investigate the structure of Uranus's magnetosphere and interior, enabling detailed studies not achievable with a flyby mission.					
4	ODINUS	Origins, Dynamics, and Interiors of the Neptunian and Uranian Systems	2034	N/A	(European Union) ESA	Orbiter	Not selected
4	ODINUS	Proposed to enhance the Uranus Orbiter and Probe mission by including twin orbiters, Freyr, named after the Norse mythological figure, being the proposed spacecraft mission to explore Uranus, each dedicated to studying Neptune and Uranus.					
5	QUEST	Quest to Uranus to Explore Solar System Theories	2032	N/A	(United States) NASA/JPL	Orbiter	Not selected
5	QUEST	An orbiter based on Juno. Planned arrival in 2045. Features elliptical polar orbit with periapsis ≈1.1 Uranus radii.					
6	PERSEUS	Plasma Environment, Radiation, Structure, and Evolution of the Uranian System	2031	N/A	(United States) NASA	Orbiter	Not selected
6	PERSEUS	Planned arrival in mid-2043.					
7	Tianwen-4	Tianwen-4	September 2029	Long March 5	(China) CNSA	Orbiter	Planned
7	Tianwen-4	Proposed to orbit Jupiter and Callisto, then fly by Uranus in March 2045 to study solar wind evolution in interplanetary space and its interactions with planetary magnetospheres.					
8	UMaMI	Uranus Magnetosphere and Moons Investigator	N/A	N/A	(United States) NASA	Orbiter	Not selected
8	UMaMI	New Frontiers-style mission concept to explore the Uranian system.					
9	Uranus Orbiter and Probe	Uranus Orbiter and Probe	Not earlier than 2031	Falcon Heavy	(United States) NASA	Orbiter	Proposed
9	Uranus Orbiter and Probe	Proposed to study Uranus and its moons, along with deploying an atmospheric probe to analyze Uranus's atmosphere.					
10	Uranus Pathfinder	Uranus Pathfinder	2022, in baseline concept January 2025	N/A, in baseline concept an Atlas V 551	(European Union) ESA	Orbiter	Not selected
10	Uranus Pathfinder	Proposed under ESA's Cosmic Vision 2015–2025, it would have used gravity assists from Earth, Venus, and Saturn. At Uranus, it planned a 45-day polar orbit with close periapsis distances to study the planet's gravitational and magnetic fields.					

== Neptune ==
Voyager 2 is the only spacecraft to visit Neptune, conducting a single flyby during its grand tour of the outer planets.

Mission		Spacecraft	Launch date	Carrier rocket	Operator	Mission Type	Outcome
1	Arcanum	Arcanum	N/A	N/A	N/A	Orbiter/Lander	Not selected
1	Arcanum	Includes "Somerville" space telescope and Triton lander "Bingham"; technology demonstrator for new heavy-lift vehicles.					
2	Argo	Argo	c. 2020s	N/A	(United States) NASA	Flyby	Not selected
2	Argo	Cancelled due to shortage of plutonium-238 required for the radioisotope thermoelectric generators (RTG). Would have focused on Neptune and its largest moon, Triton, addressing questions raised by Voyager 2's 1989 flyby and would have provided insights into the formation and evolution of ice giants.					
3	Nautilus	Nautilus	2042	N/A	(United States) NASA	Orbiter	Not selected
3	Nautilus	A Triton-focused Neptune orbiter baselined for the New Frontiers program, with launch in August 2042 and orbital insertion slated for April 2057.					
4	Neptune Odyssey	Neptune Odyssey	2033	Space Launch System proposed, Falcon Heavy as the alternative	(United States) NASA	Orbiter	Not selected
4	Neptune Odyssey	Proposed to enter a retrograde orbit around Neptune for simultaneous study of Triton, the mission would also deploy an atmospheric probe to analyze Neptune's atmosphere.					
5	New Horizons 2	New Horizons 2	N/A	N/A	(United States) NASA	Flyby	Not selected
5	New Horizons 2	Cancelled due to a shortage of plutonium-238 for the radioisotope thermoelectric generator. The probe was proposed to fly by Neptune and Triton, with 66652 Borasisi considered as a potential follow-up target.					
6	ODINUS	Origins, Dynamics, and Interiors of the Neptunian and Uranian Systems	2034	N/A	(European Union) ESA	Orbiter	Not selected
6	ODINUS	Proposed to enhance the Uranus Orbiter and Probe mission by including twin orbiters, Freyja, named after the Norse mythological figure, being the proposed spacecraft mission to explore Neptune, each dedicated to studying Neptune and Uranus.					
7	OSS	Outer Solar System	N/A	N/A	(European Union) (United States) ESA/NASA	Multiple	Not selected
7	OSS	Mission to Neptune, Triton, and Kuiper Belt.					
8	Shensuo	IHP-2	May 2024	N/A	(China) CNSA	Flyby	Proposed
8	Shensuo	Proposed to use gravity assists from Earth, Jupiter, and Neptune, the mission aims to fly by Neptune in January 2038, passing just 1,000 kilometers above its cloud tops. The probe may also release an atmospheric impactor before the flyby.					
9	Tianwen-5	Tianwen-5	N/A	N/A	(China) CNSA	Orbiter	Proposed
9	Tianwen-5	Long-term concept with launch in the 2030s and potential arrival in 2058.					
10	TOWS	Triton Ocean Worlds Surveyor	2031	N/A	(United States) NASA	Orbiter	Not selected
10	TOWS	A downscaled version of Neptune Odyssey without the atmospheric probe. Planned arrival in 2047. Baselined for New Frontiers program.					
11	Triton Hopper	Triton Hopper	N/A	N/A	(United States) NASA	Lander	Not selected
11	Triton Hopper	Proposed to harvest the nitrogen ice on the surface of Triton and use it as propellant for multiple short flights to explore a variety of locations on Triton.					
12	Trident	Trident	25 October 2025 with a backup in October 2026	N/A	(United States) NASA	Flyby	Not selected
12	Trident	Proposed mission to study Triton's surface and cryovolcanism, using a Jupiter gravity assist and a flyby of Io in 2032 to accelerate toward Neptune.					

== Pluto and trans-Neptunian objects ==
One spacecraft has visited a dwarf planet and trans-Neptunian object: New Horizons, which performed flybys of Pluto and the Kuiper belt object 486958 Arrokoth.

Mission		Spacecraft	Launch date	Carrier rocket	Operator	Mission Type	Outcome
1	Fusion-Enabled Pluto Orbiter and Lander	Fusion-Enabled Pluto Orbiter and Lander	N/A	N/A	(United States) NASA	Orbiter and lander	Not selected
1	Fusion-Enabled Pluto Orbiter and Lander	A probe equipped with a Direct Fusion Drive (DFD) propulsion system, planned to orbit and land on Pluto.					
2	Mariner Mark II	Mariner	Late 1980s	N/A	(United States) NASA	Multiple	Not selected
2	Mariner Mark II	2,000 kg spacecraft; cost ~$3.2 billion.					
3	New Horizons 2	New Horizons 2	N/A	N/A	(United States) NASA	Flyby	Not selected
3	New Horizons 2	A proposed probe that would have flew by trans-Neptunian objects using a gravity assist from Uranus.					
4	Persephone	Persephone	N/A	N/A	(United States) NASA	Orbiter	Not selected
4	Persephone	Proposed to orbit Pluto for three years, investigating the possibility of a subsurface ocean.					
5	Pluto Hop, Skip, and Jump	Pluto Hop, Skip, and Jump	N/A	N/A	(United States) NASA	Lander	Not selected
5	Pluto Hop, Skip, and Jump	Designed to land on Pluto and conduct surface operations, using Pluto's low gravity to hop between locations with small amounts of propellant.					
6	Pluto 350	Pluto 350	Early 1990s	N/A	(United States) NASA	Flyby	Not selected
6	Pluto 350	Minimalistic ~350 kg spacecraft concept.					
7	Pluto Kuiper Express	Pluto Kuiper Express	December 2004	Delta II or Space Shuttle	(United States) NASA	Orbiter	Not selected
7	Pluto Kuiper Express	A proposed probe to fly by Pluto, with a planned 2004 launch, a Jupiter assist in 2006, and a Pluto arrival by 2012. Canceled in 2000, it inspired the New Horizons mission, which launched in 2006 and reached Pluto in 2015.					
8	Pluto Orbiter/Lander/Sample Return	Pluto Orbiter/Lander/Sample Return	2003	N/A	(United States) NASA	Multiple	Not selected
8	Pluto Orbiter/Lander/Sample Return	12-year mission with mapping, multiple landings and in situ propellant production.					
9	Shensuo	IHP-1	May 2024	N/A	(China) CNSA	Flyby	Proposed
9	Shensuo	A proposed probe in the Shensuo program (Chinese: 神梭), planned to launch alongside IHP-2 and the proposed IHP-3. IHP-1 will use gravity assists from Earth in October 2025 and December 2027, followed by a Jupiter flyby in March 2029, on its way to the heliosphere. During its journey to interstellar space, it is expected to encounter 50000 Quaoar and its moon Weywot in 2040.					
