= List of missions to the outer planets =

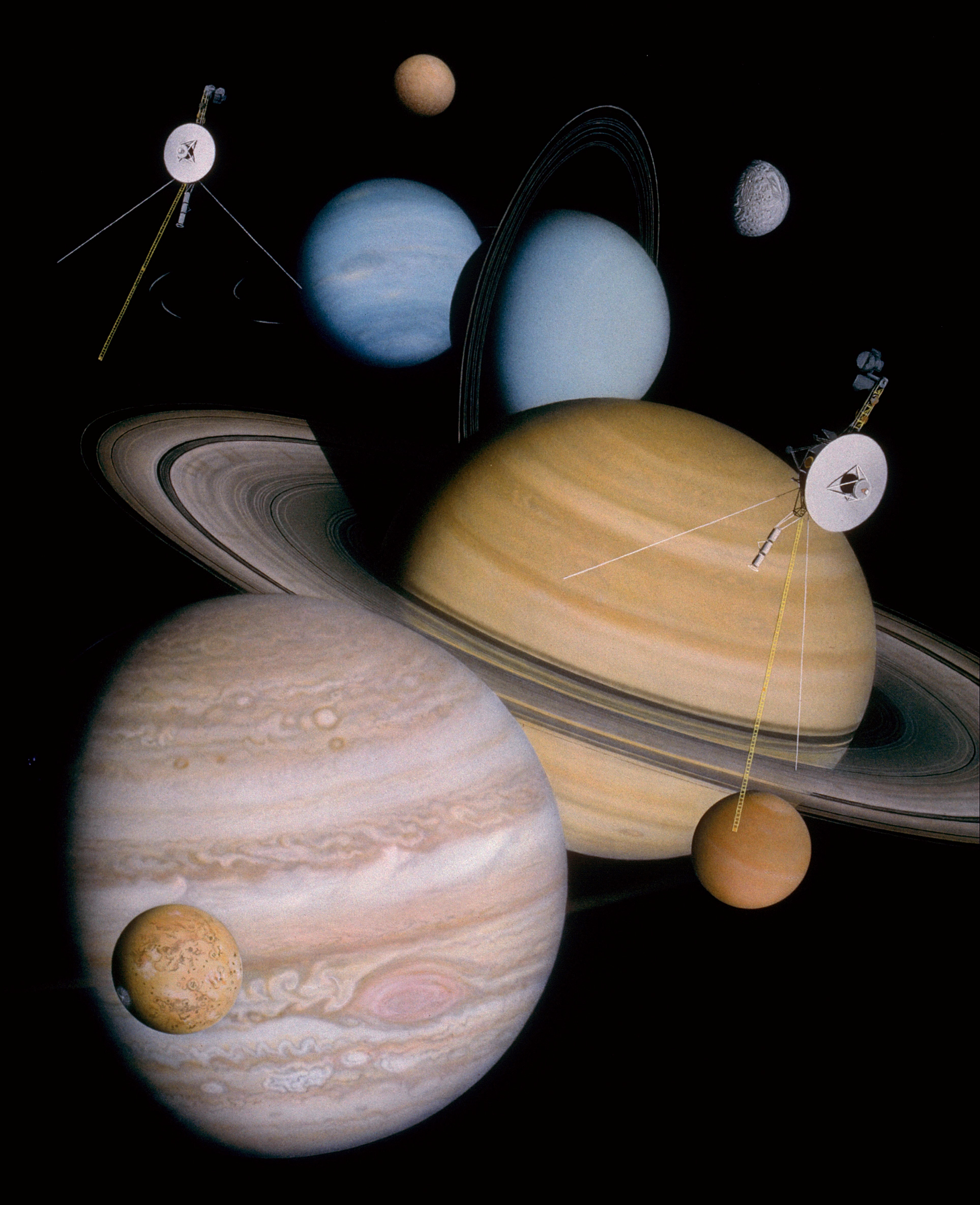
Montage of planets and some moons that the two Voyager spacecraft have visited and studied. It is the only program that visited all four outer planets.

A total of nine spacecraft have been launched on missions that involve visits to the outer planets; all nine missions involve encounters with Jupiter, with four spacecraft also visiting Saturn. Only one spacecraft, Voyager 2, has visited Uranus and Neptune. The nine missions include two, Ulysses and New Horizons, whose primary objectives were not outer planets, but which flew past Jupiter to gain gravity assists en route to a polar orbit around the Sun (Ulysses), and to Pluto (New Horizons). Pluto was considered a planet at the time that New Horizons launched, but was reclassified as a dwarf planet. Cassini–Huygens also flew past Jupiter for a gravity assist on its mission to explore Saturn.

Only three of the missions to the outer planets have been orbiters: Galileo orbited Jupiter for eight years, while Cassini orbited Saturn for thirteen years. Juno has been orbiting Jupiter since 2016.

== Summary ==
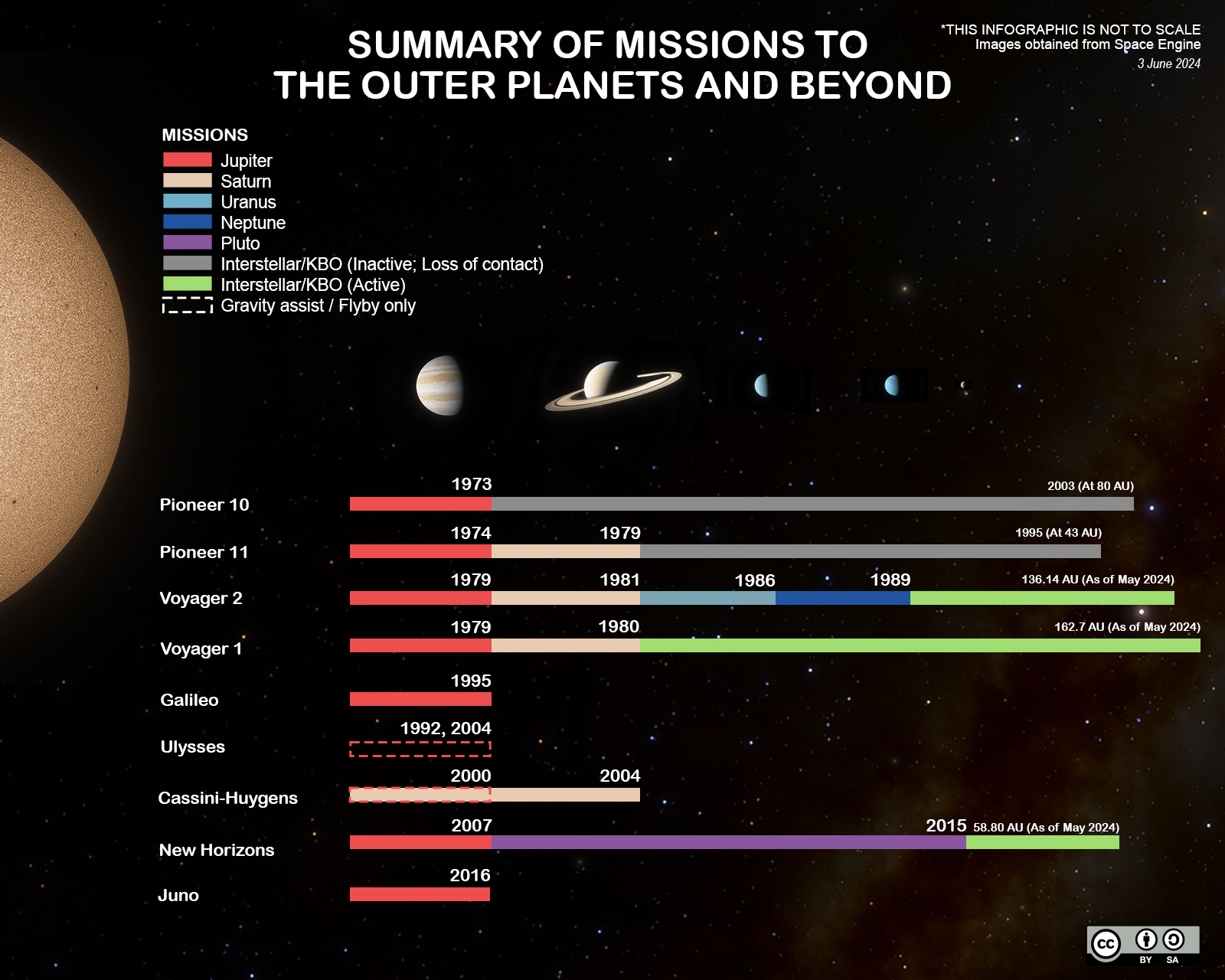
Summary of missions to the outer planets and beyond.

System Spacecraft	Jupiter Jupiter trojans	Saturn	Uranus Uranus trojans	Neptune Neptune trojans	Pluto Trans-Neptunian objects
Pioneer 10	1973 flyby Jupiter and moons				
Pioneer 11	1974 flyby Jupiter and moons	1979 flyby Saturn and moons			
Voyager 1	1979 flyby Jupiter and moons	1980 flyby Saturn and moons			
Voyager 2	1979 flyby Jupiter and moons	1981 flyby Saturn and moons	1986 flyby Uranus and moons	1989 flyby Neptune and moons	
Ulysses	1992, 2004 gravity assist Jupiter				
Galileo	1995–2003 orbiter Jupiter and moons 1995 atmospheric Jupiter				
Cassini–Huygens	2000 gravity assist Jupiter and moons	2004–2017 orbiter Saturn and moons 2005 lander Titan			
New Horizons	2007 gravity assist Jupiter and moons				2015 flyby Pluto and moons 2019 flyby 486958 Arrokoth
Juno	2016– orbiter Jupiter				
Lucy	2027– flyby mission (launched 2021); 3548 Eurybates; 15094 Polymele; 11351 Leucus; 21900 Orus; 617 Patroclus				
Jupiter Icy Moons Explorer	2031– orbiter mission (launched 2023); Jupiter and Ganymede				
Europa Clipper	2030– orbiter mission (launched 2024); Europa				

== Jupiter ==
Nine spacecraft have been launched to explore Jupiter, with two other spacecraft making gravity-assist flybys.

New Horizons, although eventually targeting Pluto, used Jupiter for a gravity assist and had an extensive almost half year observation campaign of Jupiter and its moons (hence it is counted in the eight).

Gravity assist, destination elsewhere

Mission		Spacecraft	Launch date	Carrier rocket	Operator	Mission Type	Outcome
1	Pioneer 10	Pioneer 10	3 March 1972	Atlas SLV-3C Centaur-D	(United States) NASA	Flyby	Successful
1	Pioneer 10	Humanity's first object to attain Solar system's escape velocity. First probe to traverse the asteroid belt, to reach Jovanian system, to use a gravity assist and to leave the proximity of Solar systems' planets. Held the record for fastest human-made object at the time and the most distant one until Voyager 1 overtook in 1998. Closest approach towards Jupiter was at 02:25 UTC on 4 December 1973. Flew by Callisto, Ganymede, Europa and Io at long distances. Final signal received on 23 January 2003, 12 billion km (80 AU; 7.5 billion mi) from Earth.					
2	Pioneer 11	Pioneer 11	6 April 1973	Atlas SLV-3D Centaur-D1A	(United States) NASA	Flyby	Successful
2	Pioneer 11	Closest approach towards Jupiter at 05:22 UTC on 3 December 1974. Flew by Callisto, Ganymede, Io and Europa . First probe to reach Saturnian system. Final contact was roughly at a distance of 6.5 billion km (43 AU; 4.0 billion mi)					
3	Voyager 2	Voyager 2	20 August 1977	Titan IIIE Centaur-D1T	(United States) NASA	Flyby	Successful
3	Voyager 2	Closest approach at 22:29 on 9 July 1979. Flew past Callisto, Ganymede, Europa, Amalthea and Io at long distances. Later flew past Saturn, Uranus and Neptune. Oldest active space probe at 49 years, 2 months, 20 days. Currently studying interstellar medium. At a distance of 136.1 AU (20.4 billion km; 12.7 billion mi) from Earth as of May 2024					
4	Voyager 1	Voyager 1	5 September 1977	Titan IIIE Centaur-D1T	(United States) NASA	Flyby	Successful
4	Voyager 1	Closest approach at 12:05 UTC on 5 March 1979. Flew past Amalthea, Europa, Ganymede and Callisto at long distances. Later flew past Saturn. First probe to depart heliosphere and enter interstellar medium. Most distant human-made object at a distance of 162.7 AU (24.3 billion km; 15.1 billion mi) from Earth as of May 2024.					
5	Galileo project	Galileo	18 October 1989	Space Shuttle Atlantis; STS-34 / IUS	(United States) NASA	Orbiter	Successful
5	Galileo project	Atmospheric entry probe	18 October 1989	Space Shuttle Atlantis; STS-34 / IUS	(United States) NASA	Atmospheric probe	Successful
5	Galileo project	First probe to enter Jupiter's atmosphere. Entered at 22:04 UTC on 7 December 1995 and operated for 57 minutes; main spacecraft entered orbit at 00:27 UTC on 8 December. Spacecraft was deorbited on 21 September 2003, impacting Jupiter's atmosphere at 18:57:18 UTC.					
–	Ulysses	Ulysses	6 October 1990	Space Shuttle Discovery; STS-41 / IUS	(United States) NASA/ESA	Flyby	Successful
–	Ulysses	Flyby on 8 February 1992 to reach a high-inclination heliocentric orbit. Also made a distant incidental flyby on 4 February 2004					
–	Cassini–Huygens	Cassini	15 October 1997	Titan IV(401)B Centaur-T	(United States) NASA/ESA	Flyby	Successful
–	Cassini–Huygens	Huygens lander	15 October 1997	Titan IV(401)B Centaur-T	(United States) NASA/ESA	Flyby	Successful
–	Cassini–Huygens	Flyby on 30 December 2000 en route to Saturn					
6	New Horizons	New Horizons	19 January 2006	Atlas V 551	(United States) NASA	Flyby	Successful
6	New Horizons	Gravity assist. Major observation campaign from Jan–June. Flyby on 28 February 2007 (closest approach at 05:43:40) en route to Pluto. First probe to flyby Plutonian system.					
7	Juno	Juno	5 August 2011	Atlas V 551	(United States) NASA	Orbiter	Operational
7	Juno	Entered orbit 4 July 2016. First outer planet explorer probe with solar panels.					
8	Jupiter Icy Moons Explorer	JUICE	14 April 2023	Ariane 5 ECA	ESA	Orbiter	En route
8	Jupiter Icy Moons Explorer	First interplanetary probe to the outer Solar System planets not launched by the United States and the first set to orbit a moon (Ganymede) other than Earth's Moon.					
9	Europa Clipper	Europa Clipper	14 October 2024	Falcon Heavy	(United States) NASA	Orbiter	En route
9	Europa Clipper	Jupiter orbiter with Europa flybys					

== Saturn ==
Four spacecraft have visited Saturn; Pioneer 11, Voyager 1 and Voyager 2 made flybys, while Cassini–Huygens entered orbit, and deployed a probe into the atmosphere of Titan.

Mission		Spacecraft	Launch date	Carrier rocket	Operator	Mission Type	Outcome
1	Pioneer 11	Pioneer 11	6 April 1973	Atlas SLV-3D Centaur-D1A	(United States) NASA	Flyby	Successful
1	Pioneer 11	First probe to reach Saturnian system. Closest approach on 1 September 1979 at 16:31 UTC. Flew past Iapetus, Dione, Mimas, Tethys, Enceladus, Rhea and Titan at long distances. Discovered Epimetheus and Janus.					
2	Voyager 2	Voyager 2	20 August 1977	Titan IIIE Centaur-D1T	(United States) NASA	Flyby	Successful
2	Voyager 2	Closest approach at 01:21 UTC on 26 August 1981. Flew past Iapetus, Titan, Dione, Mimas, Enceladus, Tethys and Rhea at long distances. Later flew past Uranus and Neptune.					
3	Voyager 1	Voyager 1	5 September 1977	Titan IIIE Centaur-D1T	(United States) NASA	Flyby	Successful
3	Voyager 1	Closest approach on 12 November 1980 at 23:45 UTC. Flew past Titan, Tethys, Mimas, Enceladus and Rhea.					
4	Cassini–Huygens	Cassini	15 October 1997	Titan IV(401)B Centaur-T	(United States) NASA	Orbiter	Successful
4	Cassini–Huygens	Huygens	15 October 1997	Titan IV(401)B Centaur-T	ESA	Titan lander	Successful
4	Cassini–Huygens	Entered orbit 1 July 2004. First probe to orbit Saturn. Discovered seven new moons. Huygens probe became the first spacecraft to land on Titan with the farthest landing from Earth a spacecraft ever made. It was deployed from Cassini and landed at 10:13 UTC on 14 January 2005. Mission concluded on 15 September 2017.					

== Uranus ==
Voyager 2 is the only spacecraft to have visited Uranus, making a single flyby as part of its grand tour of the outer planets.

Mission		Spacecraft	Launch date	Carrier rocket	Operator	Mission Type	Outcome
1	Voyager 2	Voyager 2	20 August 1977	Titan IIIE Centaur-D1T	(United States) NASA	Flyby	Successful
1	Voyager 2	Discovered eleven moons. Flew past Miranda, Ariel, Umbriel, Titania and Oberon. Closest approach at 17:59 UTC on 24 January 1986. Later flew past Neptune.					

== Neptune ==
Voyager 2 is the only spacecraft to have visited Neptune, making a single flyby as part of its grand tour of the outer planets.

Mission		Spacecraft	Launch date	Carrier rocket	Operator	Mission Type	Outcome
1	Voyager 2	Voyager 2	20 August 1977	Titan IIIE Centaur-D1T	(United States) NASA	Flyby	Successful
1	Voyager 2	Discovered Neptunian rings and six new moons. Flew past Larissa, Proteus and Triton. Closest approach at 03:26 UTC on 25 August 1989					

== Pluto and trans-Neptunian objects ==
New Horizons is the only spacecraft that visited dwarf planet Pluto (in 2015) and the trans-Neptunian object 486958 Arrokoth (in 2019).

Mission		Spacecraft	Launch date	Carrier rocket	Operator	Mission Type	Outcome
1	New Horizons	New Horizons	19 January 2006	Atlas V (551) AV-010 + Star 48B 3rd stage	(United States) NASA	Flyby	Successful
1	New Horizons	Flew by Pluto on July 14, 2015, flew past Arrokoth on 1 January 2019.					

== Statistics ==
=== Major milestones ===
Legend

Milestone achieved
Milestone not achieved
En route
† First to achieve

Planets
Country/Agency	Jupiter			Saturn			Uranus	Neptune	
Country/Agency	Flyby	Orbit	Atmospheric entry	Flyby	Orbit	Atmospheric entry	Flyby	Flyby	
Country/Agency	United States	Pioneer 10, 1973 †	Galileo, 1995 †	Atmospheric probe, 1995 †	Pioneer 11, 1979 †	Cassini, 2004 †	Cassini, 2017 †	Voyager 2, 1986 †	Voyager 2, 1989 †
ESA	Ulysses, 1992	Juice, TBD 2031	—	—	—	—	—	—	

Galilean moons
Country/Agency	Ganymede			Callisto	Io	Europa
Country/Agency	Flyby	Orbit	Impact	Flyby	Flyby	Flyby
United States	Pioneer 10, 1973 †	—	Europa Clipper, TBD 2034 †	Pioneer 10, 1973 †	Pioneer 10, 1973 †	Pioneer 10, 1973 †
ESA	Juice, TBD 2034	Juice, TBD 2034 †	Juice, TBD 2035	—	—	—

Major Saturnian moons
Country/Agency	Titan			Rhea	Iapetus	Dione	Tethys	Enceladus	Mimas
Country/Agency	Flyby	Orbit	Lander	Flyby	Flyby	Flyby	Flyby	Flyby	Flyby
United States	Pioneer 11, 1979 †	—	—	Pioneer 11, 1979 †	Pioneer 11, 1979 †	Pioneer 11, 1979 †	Pioneer 11, 1979 †	Pioneer 11, 1979 †	Pioneer 11, 1979 †
ESA	—	—	Huygens, 2005 †	—	—	—	—	—	—

== Future missions ==
Mission	Spacecraft	Launch date	Carrier rocket	Operator
Planned missions
Dragonfly	Dragonfly	TBD July 2028	Falcon Heavy	(United States) NASA
Dragonfly	Titan robotic rotorcraft			
Tianwen-4	Tianwen-4	TBD September 2029	Long March 5	(China) CNSA
Tianwen-4	Uranus flyby probe	TBD September 2029	Long March 5	(China) CNSA
Tianwen-4	Jupiter and Callisto orbiter; Flyby past Uranus with mission extension planned for interstellar journey			
Solar Polar Orbit Observatory	Solar Polar Orbit Observatory	NET 2029	TBD	(China) CNSA
Solar Polar Orbit Observatory	Will use a Jupiter gravity assist to reach high-inclination heliocentric orbit			
ESA Enceladus mission	TBD	Early 2040s	Ariane 6	ESA
ESA Enceladus mission	L4 mission in the ESA Science Programme's Voyage 2050 campaign.			
Proposed missions
IHP-1	Shensuo	TBD	TBD	(China) CNSA
IHP-1	Interstellar heliospheric probe with Jovian gravity assist; planned flybys of Jupiter and 50000 Quaoar			
IHP-2	Shensuo	TBD	TBD	(China) CNSA
IHP-2	Interstellar heliospheric probe with Jovian gravity assist; planned flybys of Jupiter, Neptune, Triton and a Kuiper belt object			
Uranus Orbiter and Probe	Uranus orbiter	NET 2031	Falcon Heavy (expendable)	(United States) NASA
Uranus Orbiter and Probe	Uranus probe	NET 2031	Falcon Heavy (expendable)	(United States) NASA
Uranus Orbiter and Probe	Uranus orbiter after a flyby of Jupiter; Uranus atmospheric probe			
Enceladus Orbilander	Enceladus Orbilander	NET 2038		(United States) NASA
Enceladus Orbilander	Enceladus orbiter/lander			

== See also ==
- Timeline of Solar System exploration
  - List of missions to Venus
  - List of missions to the Moon
  - List of missions to Mars
  - List of missions to minor planets
  - List of missions to comets
- List of extraterrestrial orbiters
- Interstellar probe
  - List of artificial objects leaving the Solar System
  - List of proposed Solar System probes
- Kuiper belt (approx. 30–50 AU, Pluto largest of this group)
- List of proposed missions to the outer planets
- List of trans-Neptunian objects (numbered, excludes comets, see Trans-Neptunian object)
