= Neptune Odyssey =

NASA orbiter mission concept to study the Neptune system

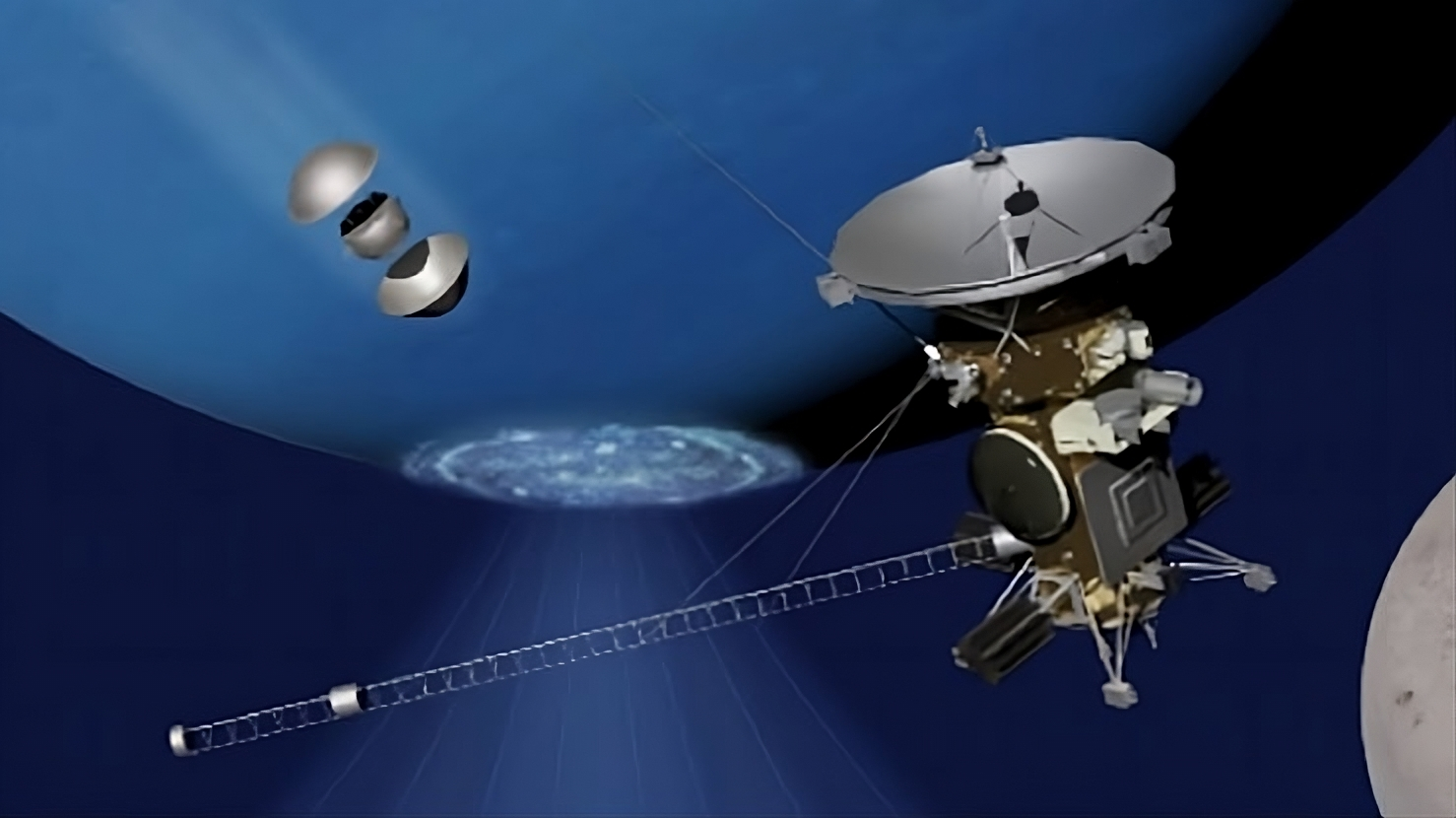
- Artistic rendering of the orbiter and separated atmospheric probe, as of 2021
- Mission type: Neptune orbiter
- Operator: NASA
- Mission duration: Cruise: 16 years Science phase: 4 years

Spacecraft properties
- Launch mass: 3,218 kg (7,094 lb)
- Dry mass: 1,594 kg (3,514 lb)
- Payload mass: 214 kg (472 lb) plus 220 kg (490 lb) atmospheric probe
- Dimensions: Height: 6.96 m (22.8 ft); Diameter: 4.56 m (15.0 ft)
- Power: 1,087 W (1.458 hp) from 3 Next-Generation Radioisotope thermoelectric generators

Start of mission
- Launch date: 2033 (proposed)
- Rocket: Space Launch System (proposed); Falcon Heavy (alternative)

Neptune orbiter
- Orbital insertion: 2049 (proposed)

Neptune atmospheric probe
- Atmospheric entry: 2049 (proposed)

Neptune Odyssey is an orbiter mission concept to study Neptune and its moons, particularly Triton. The orbiter would enter into a retrograde orbit of Neptune to facilitate simultaneous study of Triton and would launch an atmospheric probe to characterize Neptune's atmosphere. The concept is being developed as a potential large strategic science mission for NASA by a team led by the Applied Physics Laboratory at Johns Hopkins University. The current proposal targets a launch in 2033 using the Space Launch System with arrival at Neptune in 2049, although trajectories using gravity assists at Jupiter have also been considered with launch dates in 2031.

The mission concept was considered for possible recommendation as a mission priority in the 2023–2032 Planetary Science Decadal Survey. However, for logistical reasons the Uranus Orbiter and Probe mission was selected as the ice giant orbiter mission recommendation, with top priority ahead of the Enceladus Orbilander.

== Background ==
Voyager 2 is the only space probe to have visited the Neptune system, completing a flyby on August 25, 1989. An orbiter to Neptune was considered as part of the aborted Mariner Mark II program in the 1990s, and several mission concepts for an orbiter were developed in the 2000s, including a concept by the California Institute of Technology and a version by the University of Idaho and Boeing, though none were selected for further development. Some concepts included nuclear-electric propulsion to shorten travel times and increase payload to Neptune. The 2011-2022 Planetary Science Decadal Survey recommended a Flagship-class orbiter mission to an ice giant with priority behind what would become the Mars 2020 rover and the Europa Clipper. Ice giants are now appreciated as a common type of exoplanet, precipitating the need for further study of ice giants in the Solar System. The ice giants Uranus and Neptune were seen as unique yet equally compelling scientific targets, but a Uranus Orbiter and Probe was given preference for logistical and cost reasons. A Uranus orbiter would logically follow Flagship-class orbiter missions undertaken at Jupiter and Saturn (Galileo and Cassini, respectively). A mission to Neptune is viewed by some to be of greater scientific merit because Triton, likely a captured Kuiper belt object and ocean world, is a more compelling astrobiology target than the moons of Uranus (though Ariel and Miranda in particular are possible ocean worlds). Nevertheless, again due to cost and logistical considerations including launch vehicle availability and available launch windows, the 2023–2032 Planetary Science Decadal Survey recommended the Uranus Orbiter and Probe instead of Neptune Odyssey. A less capable version of the Odyssey concept with more focus on Triton in lieu of ice giant science called Triton Ocean World Surveyor (TOWS) is being developed as a possible future New Frontiers mission. Another Triton-focused Neptune orbiter proposal called Nautilus was developed by several graduate students at the Jet Propulsion Laboratory in summer 2023; under the New Frontiers program, it would be launched in August 2042 and arrive in orbit in April 2057. The Chinese Academy of Sciences, along with other institutions of the Chinese space program, have proposed a nuclear electric probe which would fly past Jupiter on its way to orbit Neptune, where it could potentially deploy an atmospheric probe, or landers and surface penetrators for Triton.

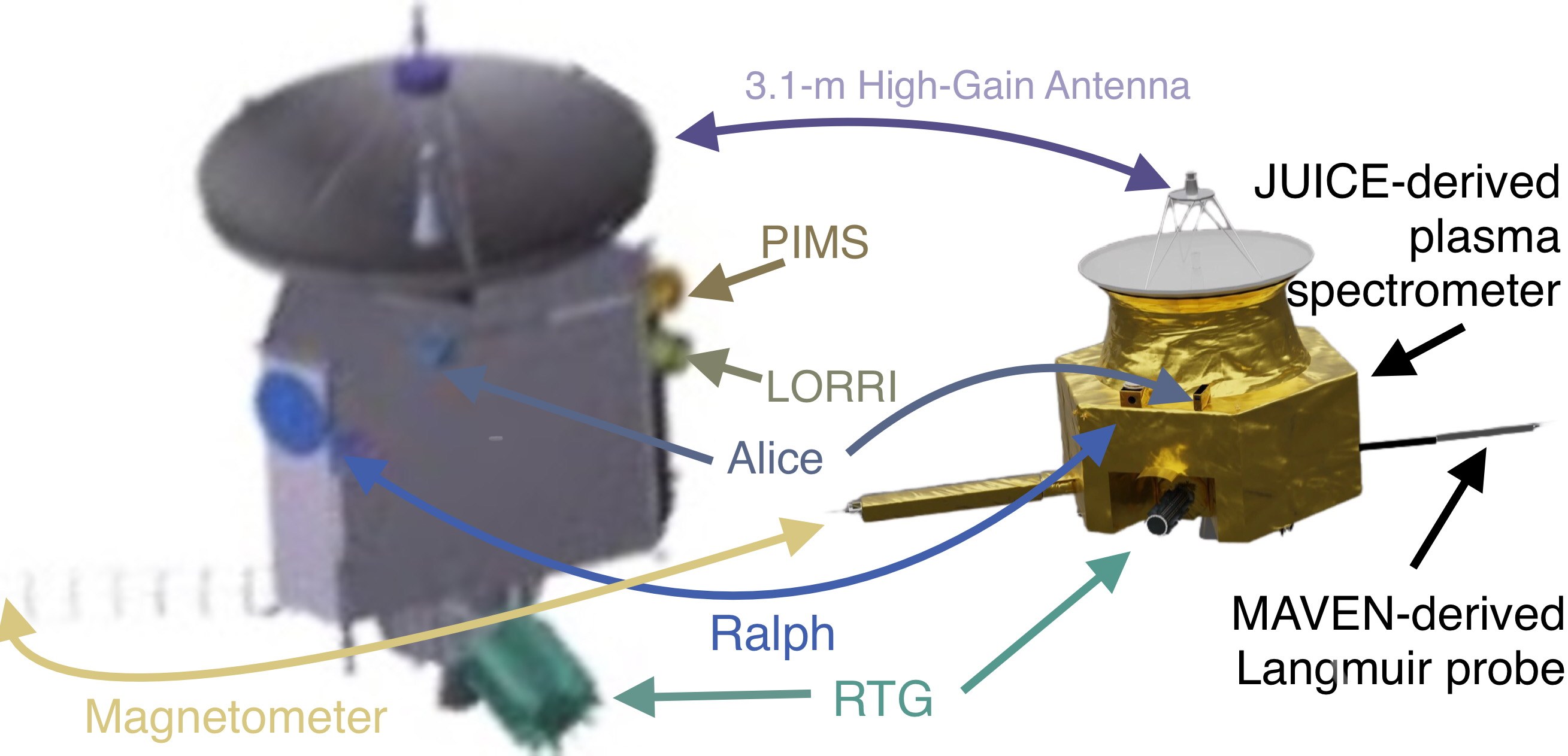
TOWS and Nautilus comparison (not to scale), illustrating their fewer instruments compared to Odyssey

Two flyby mission proposals for Neptune and Triton also exist, both of which would conduct a flyby in 2038. The China National Space Administration's Interstellar Express, a trio of probes designed to explore the heliosphere, would have its second probe (IHP-2) explore Neptune and deliver an atmospheric probe before going off to explore a Kuiper Belt object and fly toward the tail of the heliosphere. NASA's Trident was a finalist for selection as a Discovery mission in 2020, with a proposed launch in 2025 and an intent to focus on Triton. In June 2021, it was announced that Trident was not selected for development and launch, while Interstellar Express is yet to be approved by CNSA.

== Objectives ==
Artist's concept of a nuclear-electric Neptune orbiter with potential atmospheric probes and a Triton lander, c. early 2000s

There are five primary scientific questions to be addressed by an orbiter at Neptune:

- How do the interiors and atmospheres of ice giant [exo]planets form and evolve?
- What causes Neptune's strange magnetic field, and how do its magnetosphere and aurorae work?
- Is Triton an ocean world? What causes its plumes? What is the nature of its atmosphere?
- How can Triton's geophysics and composition expand our knowledge of dwarf planets like Pluto?
- What are the connections between Neptune's rings, arcs, surface weathering, and small moons?

== Mission concept ==
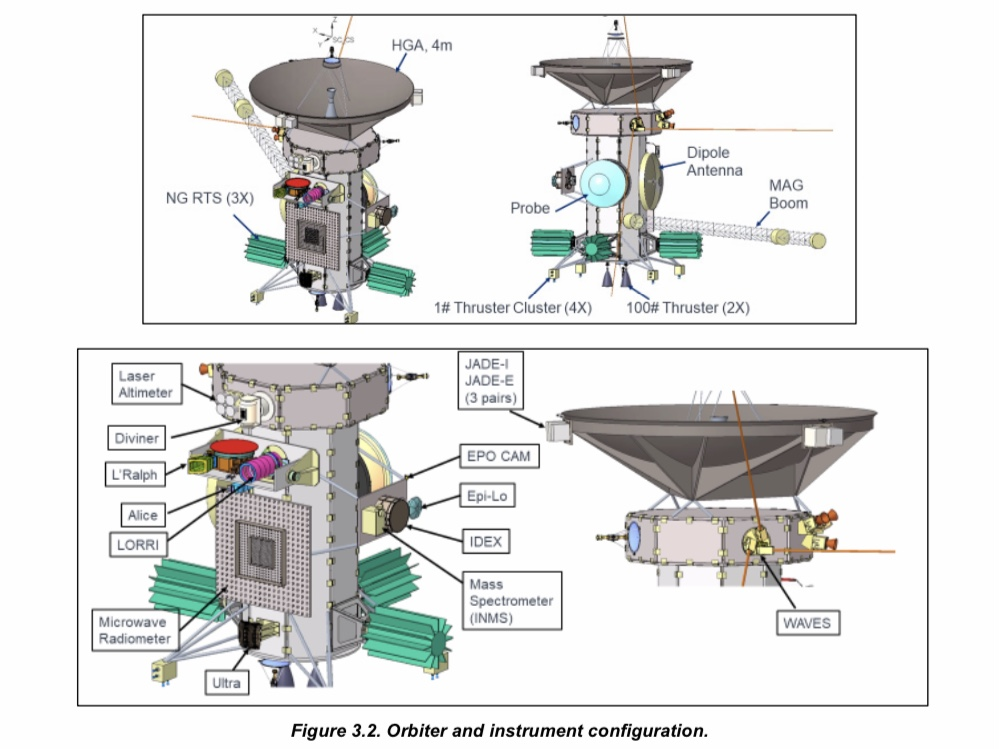
Schematic of the proposed Neptune Odyssey probe

The present proposal targets a launch in 2033 using the Space Launch System and a 16-year cruise directly to Neptune, with launch windows yearly during the 2030s. The cruise could be shortened to 12 years with a gravity assist at Jupiter, but this would require launch prior to 2032. A 220 kg (490 lb) atmospheric probe will be released from the orbiter before orbital insertion at Neptune and descend for around 37 minutes into Neptune's atmosphere to study its composition, dynamics, and processes, sending data at least until reaching a pressure of 10 bars. After achieving Neptune orbit, the orbiter will conduct at least 46 flybys of Triton over the four-year main science phase, achieving near-global coverage of the moon while simultaneously studying Neptune and other moons. The orbiter would then orbit progressively closer to Neptune and its rings on a "Grand Finale" similar to the Grand Finale of Cassini and eventually be destroyed in Neptune's atmosphere for planetary protection purposes.

The current proposal does not include a Triton lander. Both a static lander similar to the Huygens probe to Titan and an impactor that would release surface material for direct study by the orbiter were considered. Ultimately, due to the incomplete knowledge of Triton's surface, risk of the close approach to Triton that an impactor would require, and priority of the atmospheric probe with respect to payload limitations, a lander is not presently part of the mission concept.

=== Orbiter instruments ===
The orbiter is proposed to carry 14 scientific instruments.

Instrument	Heritage Instrument	Heritage Mission
Magnetometer	MESSENGER Magnetometer	MESSENGER
Color Narrow-Angle Camera	Long Range Reconnaissance Imager (LORRI)	New Horizons
Ultraviolet Imaging Spectrograph	Alice	New Horizons
Ion and Neutral Mass Spectrometer	Ion and Neutral Mass Spectrometer	Cassini
Laser Altimeter	Mercury Laser Altimeter	MESSENGER
Visible-Near Infrared Imaging Spectrometer	Ralph	New Horizons
Radio and Plasma Wave Detector	Waves	Juno
Thermal Infrared Imager	Diviner	Lunar Reconnaissance Orbiter
Microwave Radiometer	Microwave Radiometer	Juno
Thermal Plasma Spectrometer	Jovian Auroral Distributions Experiment (JADE)	Juno
Energetic Charged Particle Detector	EPI-Lo	Parker Solar Probe
Energetic Neutral Atom Imager	IMAP-Ultra	Interstellar Mapping and Acceleration Probe
Dust Detector	Interstellar Dust Experiment (IDEX)	Interstellar Mapping and Acceleration Probe
Public Engagement Camera (visible)	Comet Infrared and Visible Analyser (CIVA)	Rosetta

=== Atmospheric probe instruments ===
The atmospheric probe is proposed to carry 8 scientific instruments.

Instrument	Heritage Instrument	Heritage Mission
Mass Spectrometer	Huygens mass spectrometer	Huygens
Atmospheric Structure Instrument	Huygens Atmospheric Structure Instrument (HASI)	Huygens
Helium Abundance Detector	Galileo probe Helium Abundance Detector	Galileo
Ortho-Para H_{2} Detector	(in development)	none
Nephelometer	Galileo probe Nephelometer	Galileo
Net Flux Radiometer	Galileo probe net-flux radiometer	Galileo
Doppler Wind Experiment	Huygens Doppler Wind Experiment (DWE)	Huygens
Public Engagement Camera	Philae camera	Philae
