= Trident (spacecraft) =

NASA space probe proposal to study the ice giant planet Neptune and its moon Triton

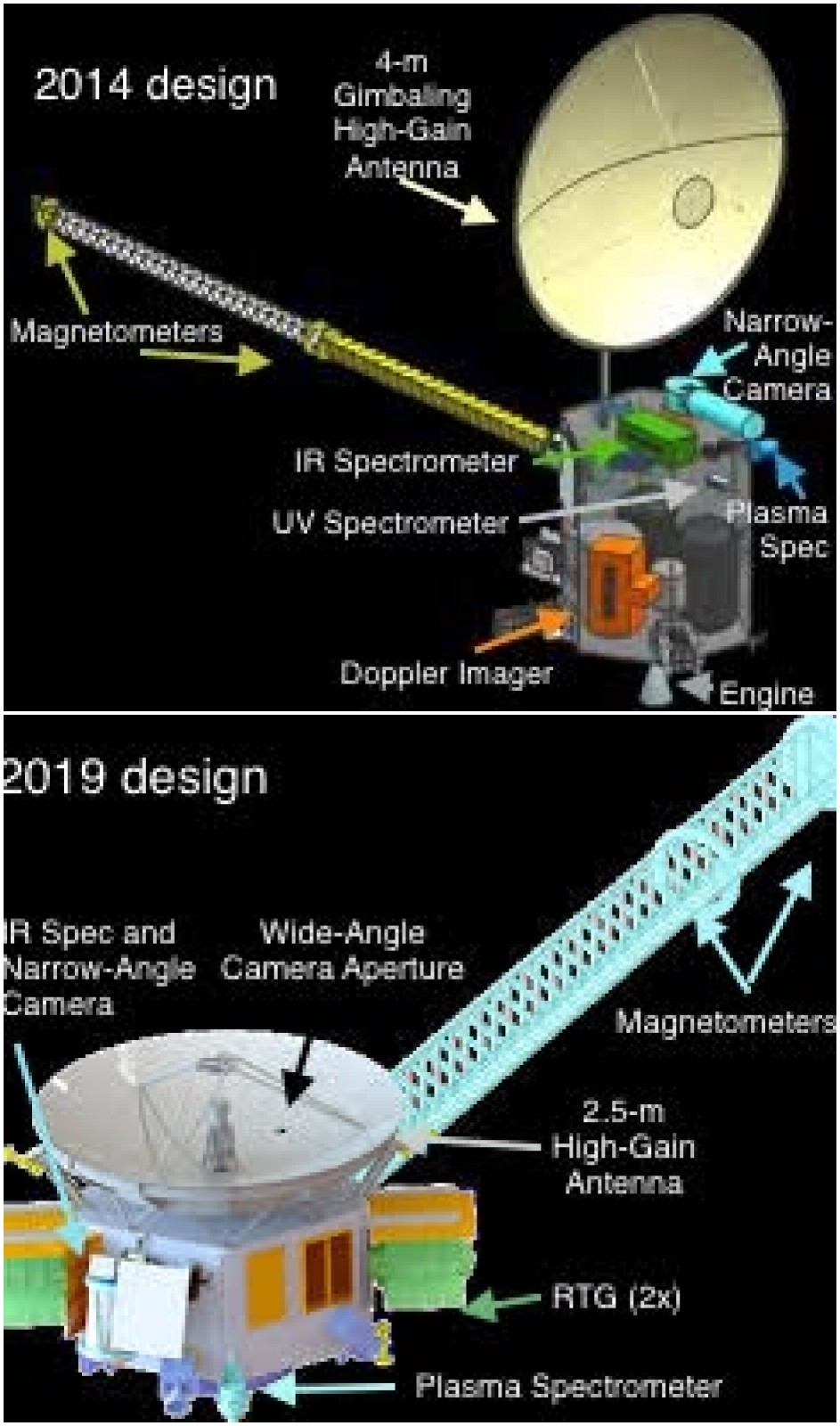
- Comparison of two designs for Trident
- Mission type: Reconnaissance, flyby of outer planets
- Operator: NASA
- Mission duration: 13 years (planned)

Start of mission
- Launch date: Proposed: 25 October 2025 (with a backup in October 2026)

Flyby of Earth (gravity assist)
- Closest approach: 28 October 2026

Flyby of Venus (gravity assist)
- Closest approach: 25 March 2027

Flyby of Earth (gravity assist)
- Closest approach: 7 February 2028

Flyby of Earth (gravity assist)
- Closest approach: 7 February 2031

Flyby of Jupiter, Io (gravity assist)
- Closest approach: 28 June 2032
- Distance: 1.24 R_{J} or 88,650 km (55,080 mi)

Flyby of Neptune, Triton
- Closest approach: 28 June 2038

Trident was a space mission concept to explore the outer planets proposed in 2019 to NASA's Discovery Program. The concept included flybys of Jupiter and Neptune with a focus on Neptune's largest moon Triton.

In 2020, Trident was selected along with three other Discovery proposals for further study, with two expected to be selected to fly as Discovery 15 and 16. On 2 June 2021, NASA selected the Venus missions DAVINCI+ and VERITAS over Trident and the Io Volcano Observer.

== Background ==
Triton is the largest moon of Neptune. In 1989, Voyager 2 flew past the moon at a distance of 40,000 km (25,000 mi), and discovered several cryovolcanoes on its surface. Triton is geologically active. Its surface is young and has relatively few impact craters. It has a very thin atmosphere. Voyager 2 was only able to observe approximately 40% of Triton's surface.

The Trident concept was proposed in March 2019 to NASA's Discovery Program. The mission concept was supported by NASA's Ocean Worlds Exploration Program and it was intended to help answer some of the questions generated by Voyager 2's flyby in 1989.

== Overview ==
Trident would have taken advantage of an efficient gravity assist alignment of Jupiter and Neptune (that occurs once every 13 years) to capitalize on a narrow observational window enabling assessment of changes in Triton's plume activity and surface characteristics since the previous Neptune-Triton encounter by Voyager 2 in 1989.

With the advances of high-resolution imaging and a unique orbital configuration of Triton in 2038, Trident would have been able to obtain a near-complete map of Neptune's moon during its flyby. Trident would have passed through Triton's thin atmosphere, within 500 km (310 mi) of the surface, sampling its ionosphere with a plasma spectrometer and performing magnetic induction measurements to assess the potential existence of an internal ocean. The principal investigator was Louise Prockter, director of the Lunar and Planetary Institute in Houston, Texas.

The launch vehicle proposed for Trident was the Atlas V 401, possibly to be replaced by the Vulcan.

The proposed launch date in October 2025 (with a backup in October 2026) would have taken advantage of a once-in-13-years window when Earth is properly aligned with Jupiter. The spacecraft would use the gravitational pull of Jupiter as a slingshot to Triton for an extended 13-day encounter in 2038.

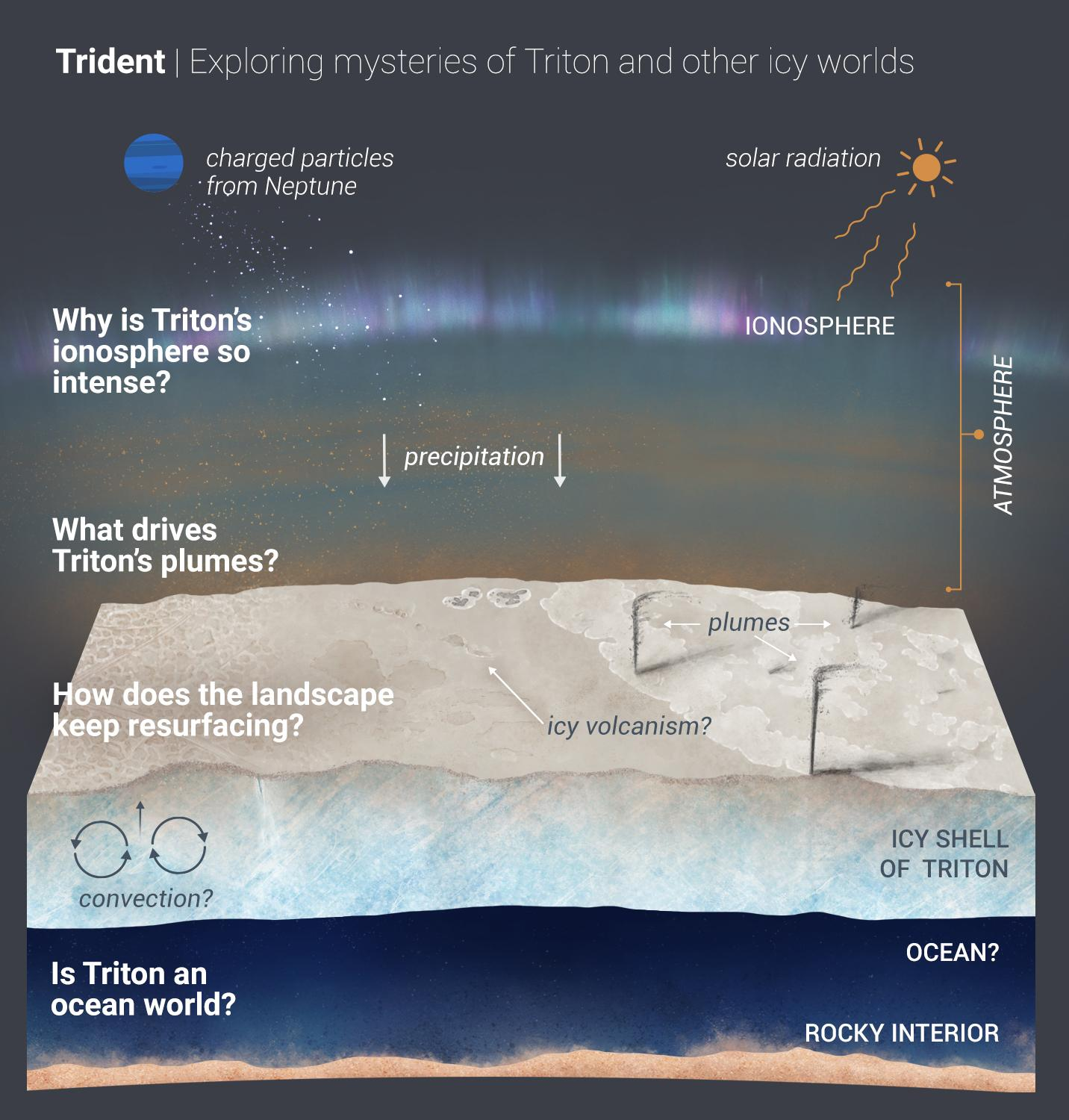
Neptune Moon Triton - Proposed Trident Mission (16 June 2020)

== Payload ==
Instrument	Functionality	Heritage (Contractor)
Infrared spectrometer	2–100 km, near-global compositional mapping at 1-5 μm wavelength.	Ralph (New Horizons) (Ball Aerospace)
Narrow angle camera	Anti-Neptune regional mapping and limb imaging (≤ 200 m).	Cassini camera and LORRI (New Horizons) (Ball)
Wide-angle camera	Sub-Neptune and haze imaging and change detection (≤ 2,500 m).	Ralph and Cassini camera (Jet Propulsion Laboratory)
Triaxial magnetometer	Ocean detection.	Cassini boom, Psyche and MESSENGER magnetometers (UCLA)
Radio science	Atmospheric occultations for neutral and electron profiles; gravimetry observations	REX (New Horizons) and BepiColombo (Italian Space Agency)
Plasma spectrometer	Atmospheric charged particles. Energetic inputs to ionosphere.	ICA (Rosetta) and JDC (JUICE)(IRF)

== Objects that Trident would visit ==
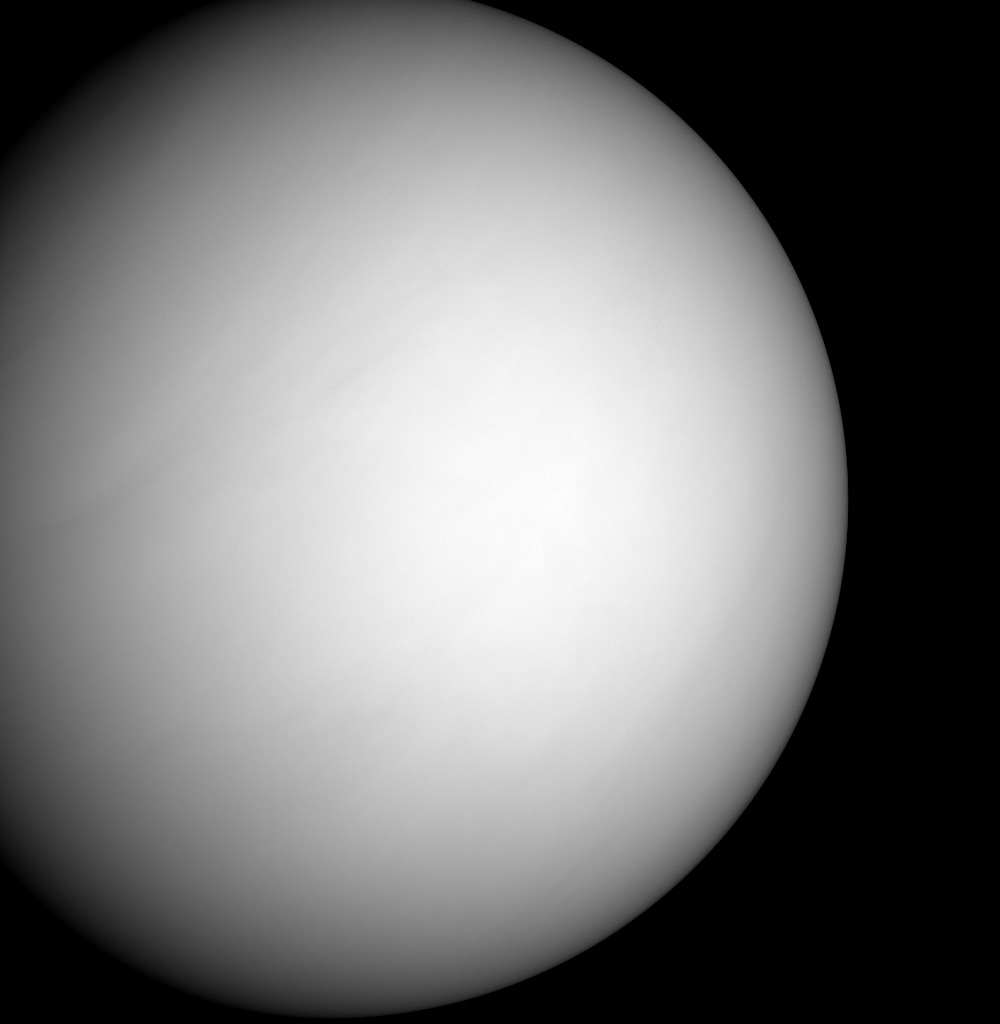
Venus (flyby)

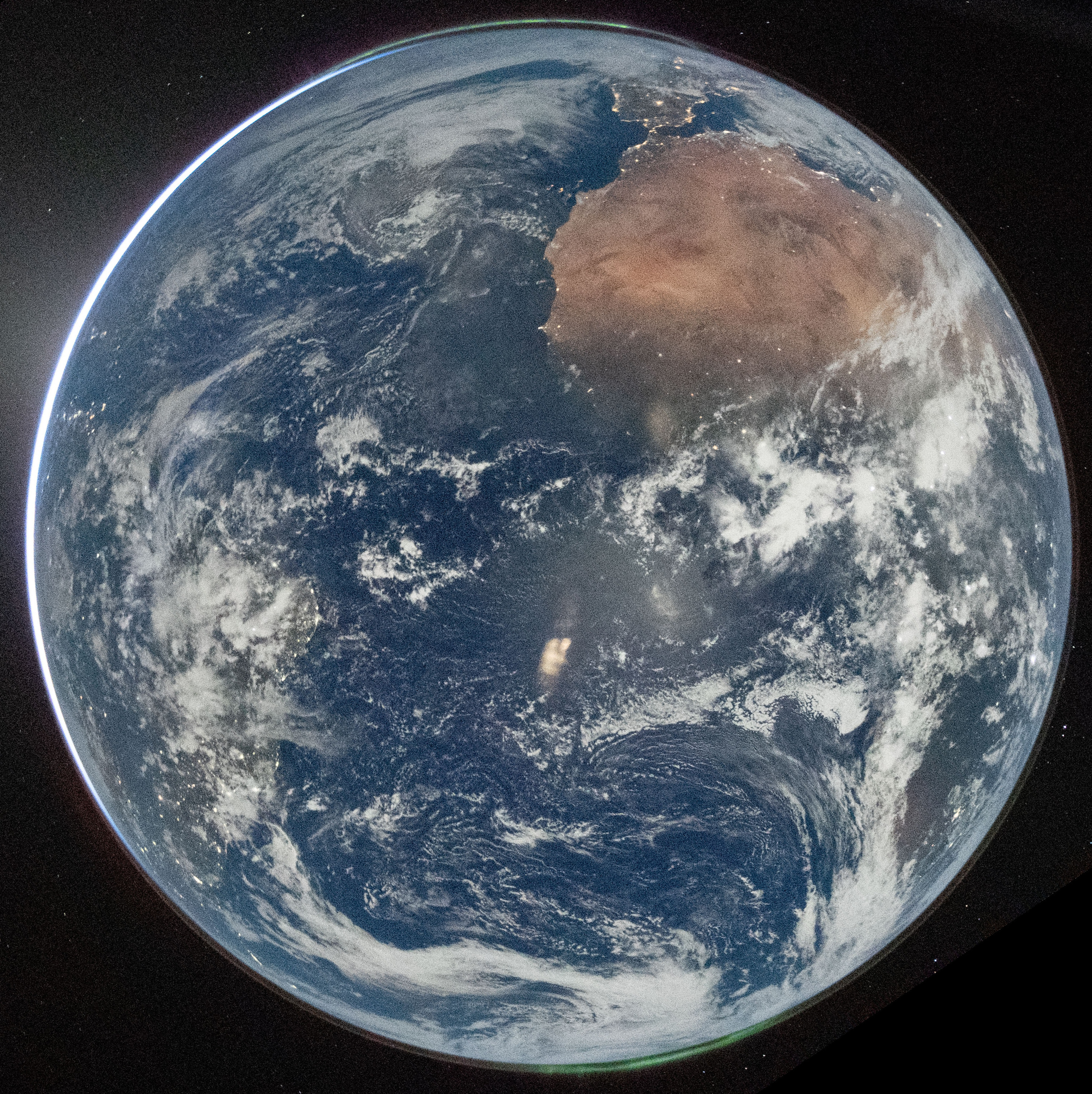
Earth (3x flybys)

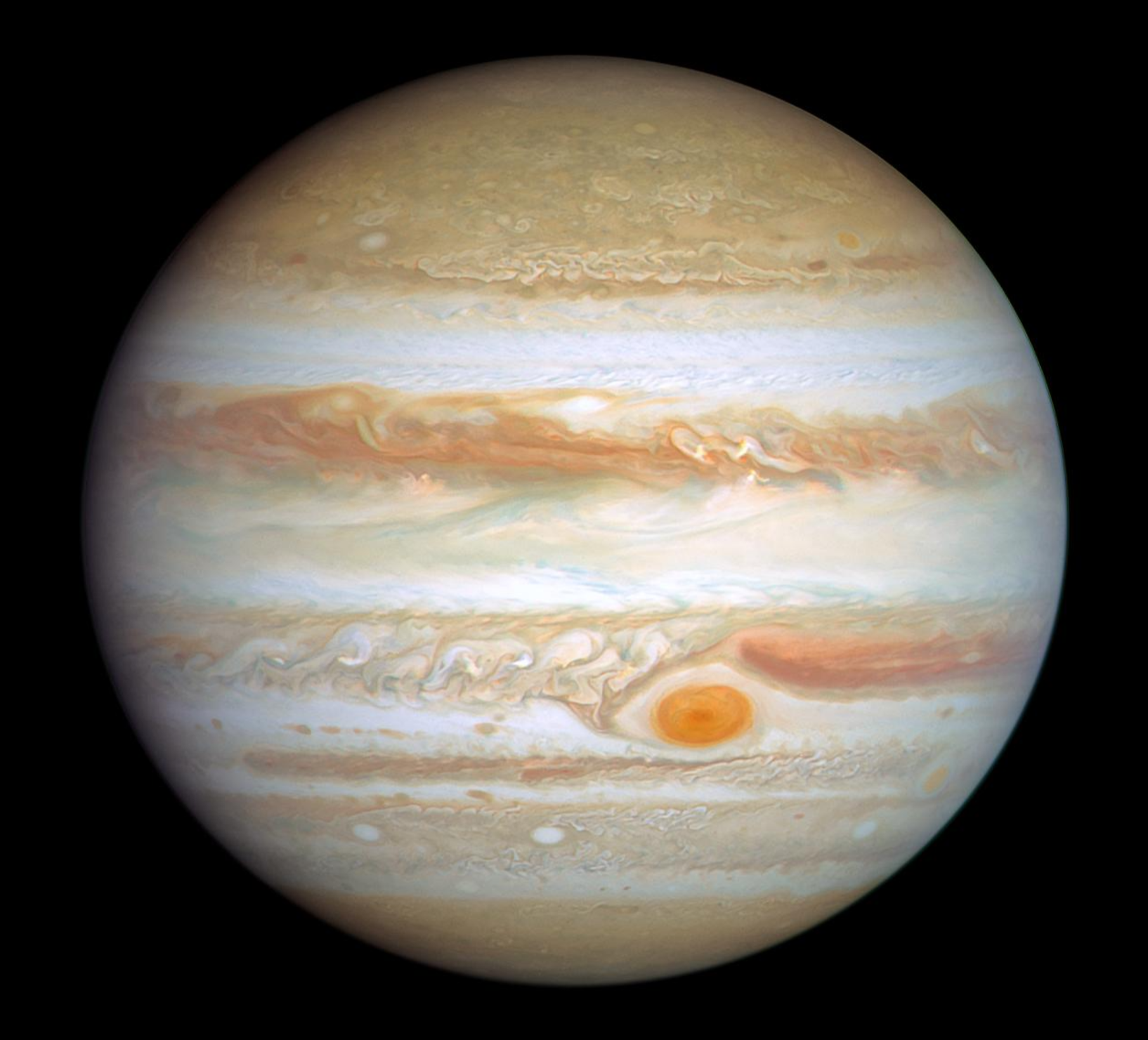
Jupiter (flyby)

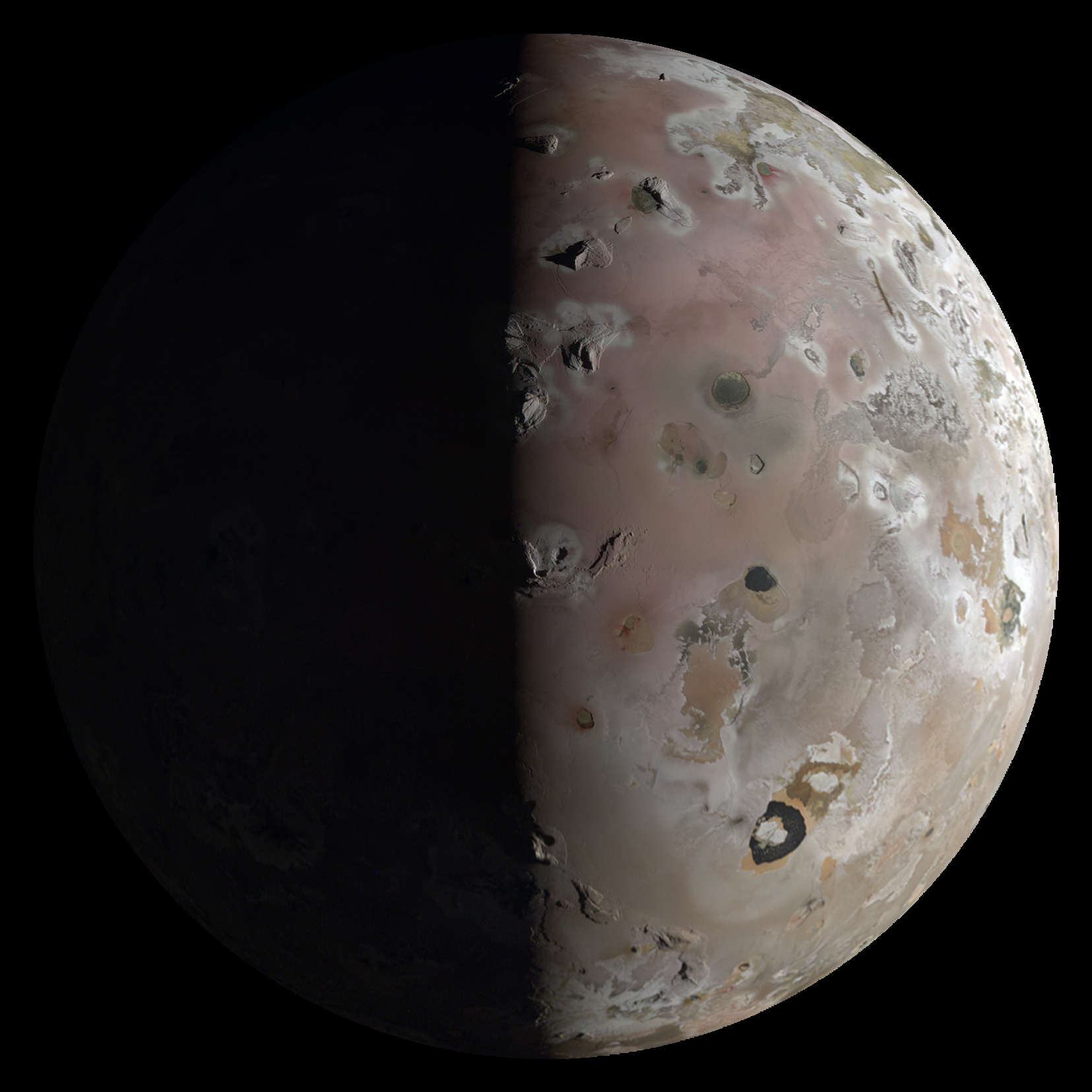
Io (flyby)

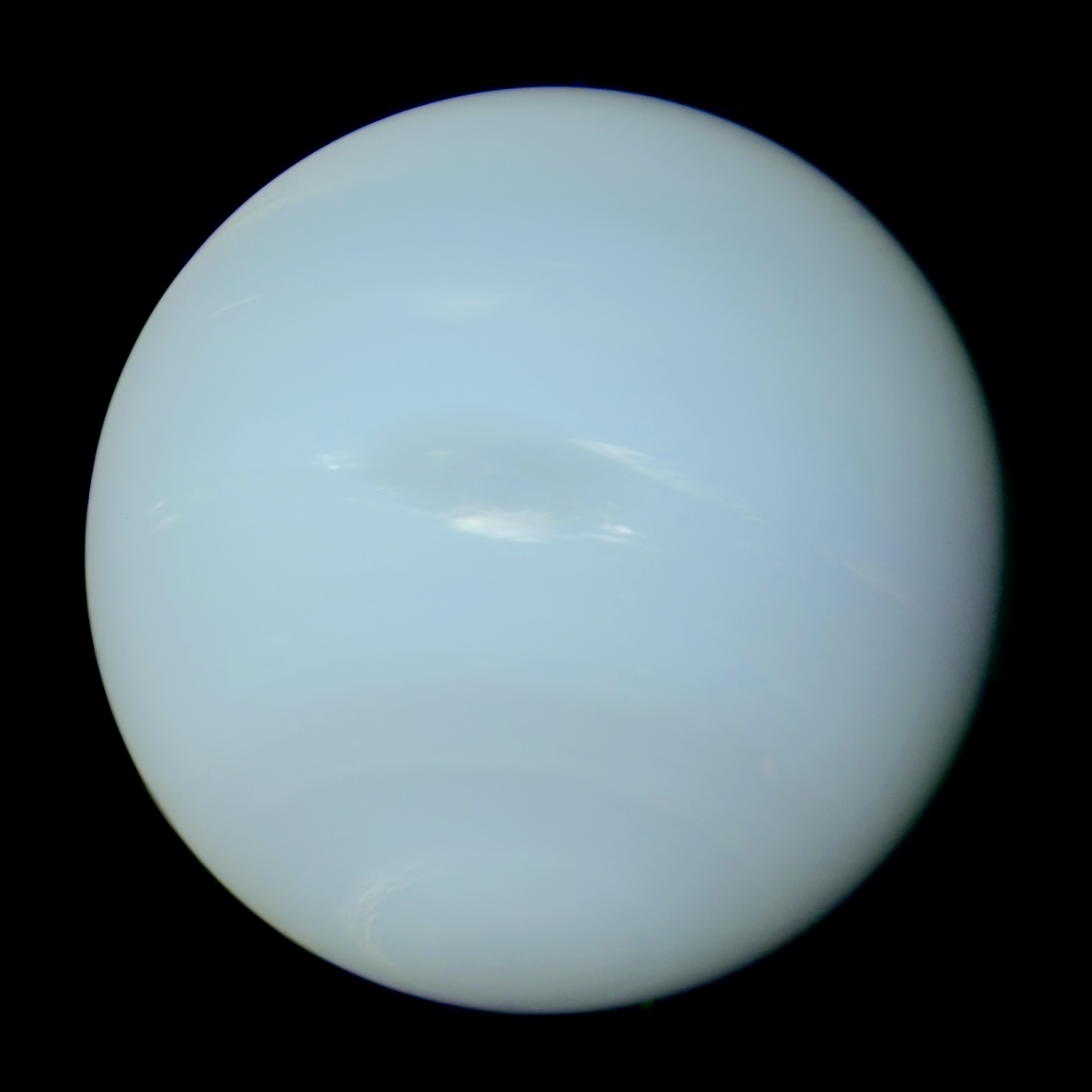
Neptune (targeted flyby)

Triton (targeted flyby)

== See also ==
- Argo, a 2009 Triton flyby mission concept
- Shensuo, a Chinese probe proposed to fly by Neptune and Triton in January 2038 en route to the tail of the heliosphere
- New Horizons probe, performed a Pluto flyby in 2015
- New Horizons 2, a mission proposed in 2002 which might have included a Triton flyby
- Triton Hopper, a lander concept to Triton
