= Argo (NASA spacecraft) =

2009 NASA spacecraft mission concept

- Mission type: Reconnaissance; Multiple flyby Outer planets Kuiper belt exploration
- Operator: NASA

Spacecraft properties
- Power: RTG (proposed)

Start of mission
- Launch date: Launch window: 2020s

Flyby of Neptune, Triton, and one KBO
- Closest approach: Neptune: 8-11 years after launch. KBO: an additional 3-5 years

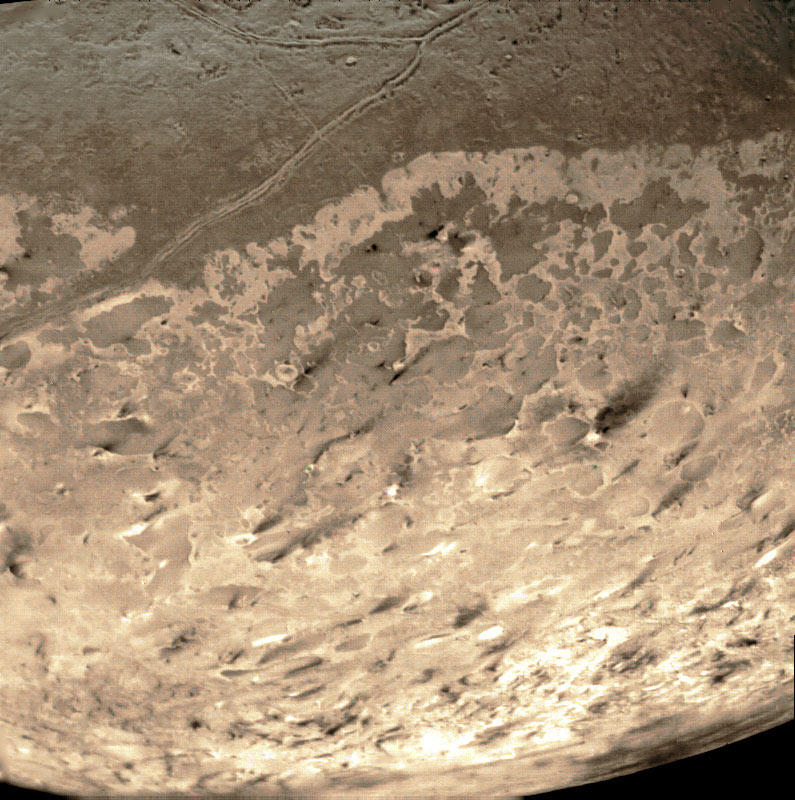
Triton's south pole, as imaged by Voyager 2 in 1989

Argo was a 2009 spacecraft mission concept by NASA to the outer planets and beyond. The concept included flybys of Jupiter, Saturn, Neptune, and a Kuiper belt object. A focus on Neptune and its largest moon Triton would have helped answer some of the questions generated by Voyager 2's flyby in 1989, and would have provided clues to ice giant formation and evolution.

== Mission ==
The Argo mission was meant to compete for the New Frontiers mission 4 (~$650M). One of the reasons Argo was not formally proposed was the shortage of plutonium-238 for the required radioisotope thermoelectric generator (RTG) for electric power. The current launch window for this mission had been particularly favorable. It opened in 2015 and lasted through the end of 2019, so future missions would need to be redesigned for the relevant planetary alignments.

It was noted that although it offered a Neptune mission at the price of New Frontier's budget, it would be flyby only, limiting the amount of time at Neptune and Triton compared to an orbiter. However, the advantage would be access to a wide variety of Kuiper belt objects by using a gravity assist at Neptune, which would allow a wide range of objects to potentially be targeted. In addition, with a flyby of Jupiter and Saturn, the Planetary Society compared the mission to Voyager 2.

== Itinerary ==
During its flybys of the giant planets, there would have been potentially well over 100 other moons that could have been studied, and beyond Neptune, the possibility of visiting Kuiper belt objects.

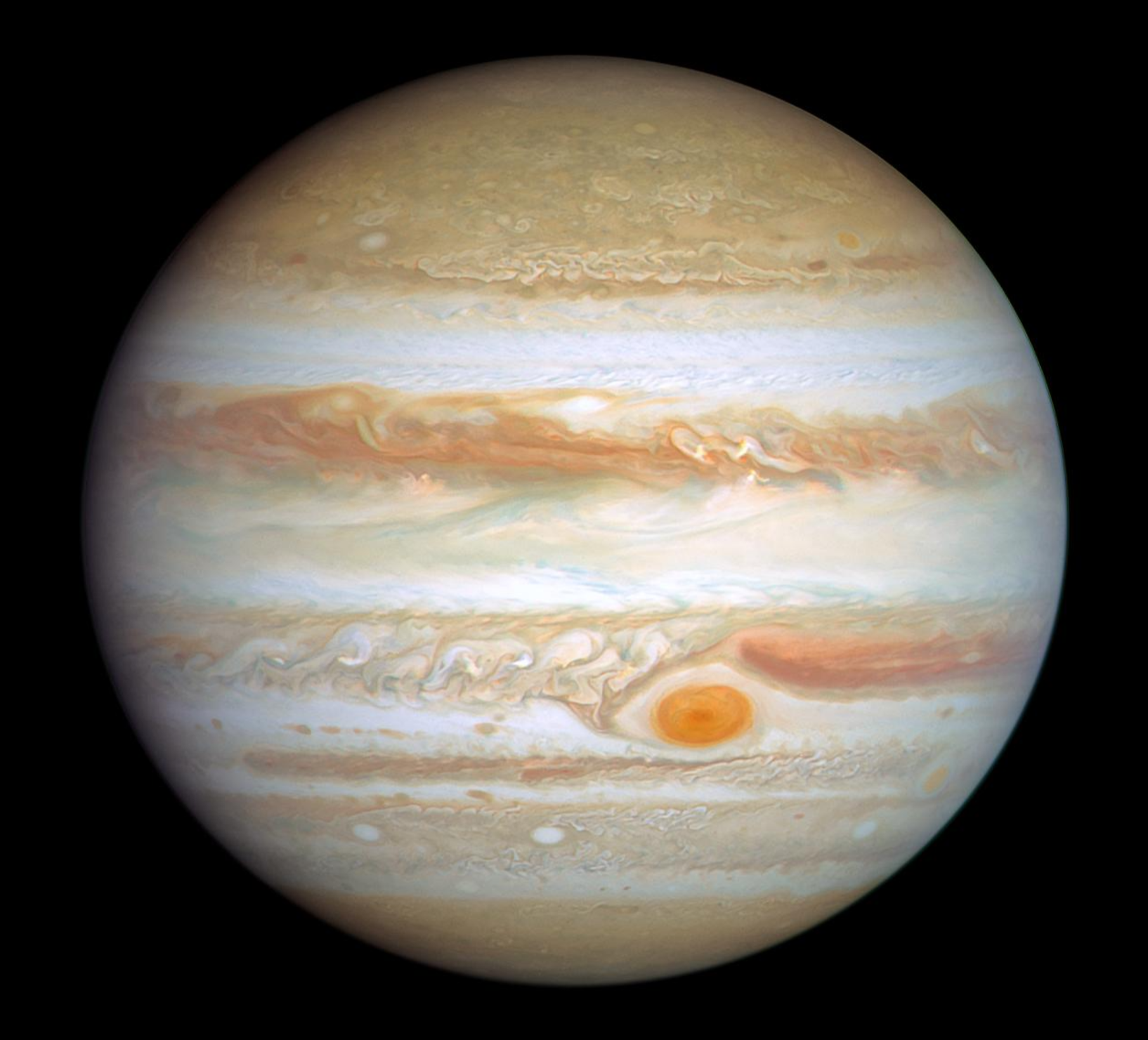
Jupiter, 2024

Saturn, 2008

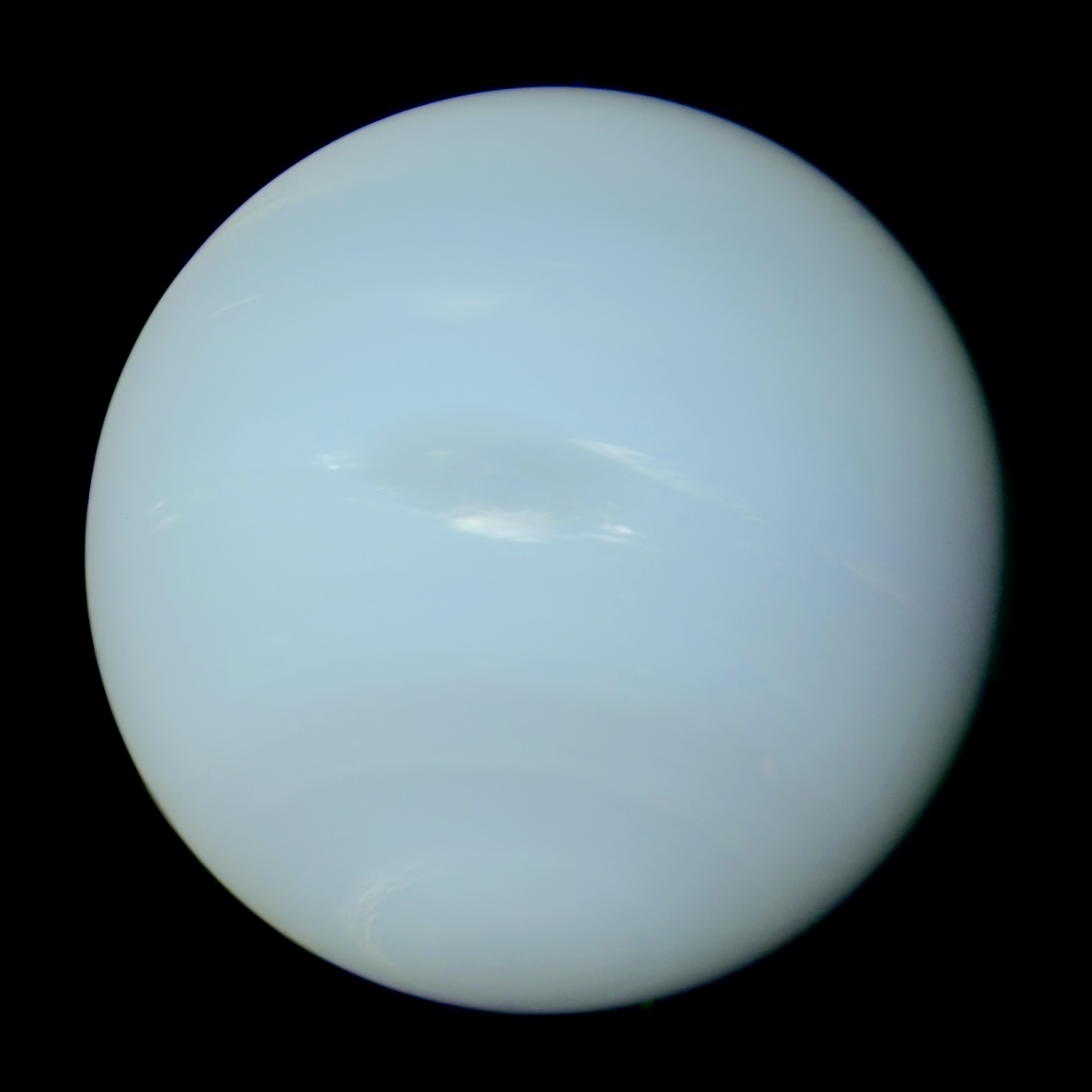
Neptune, 1989

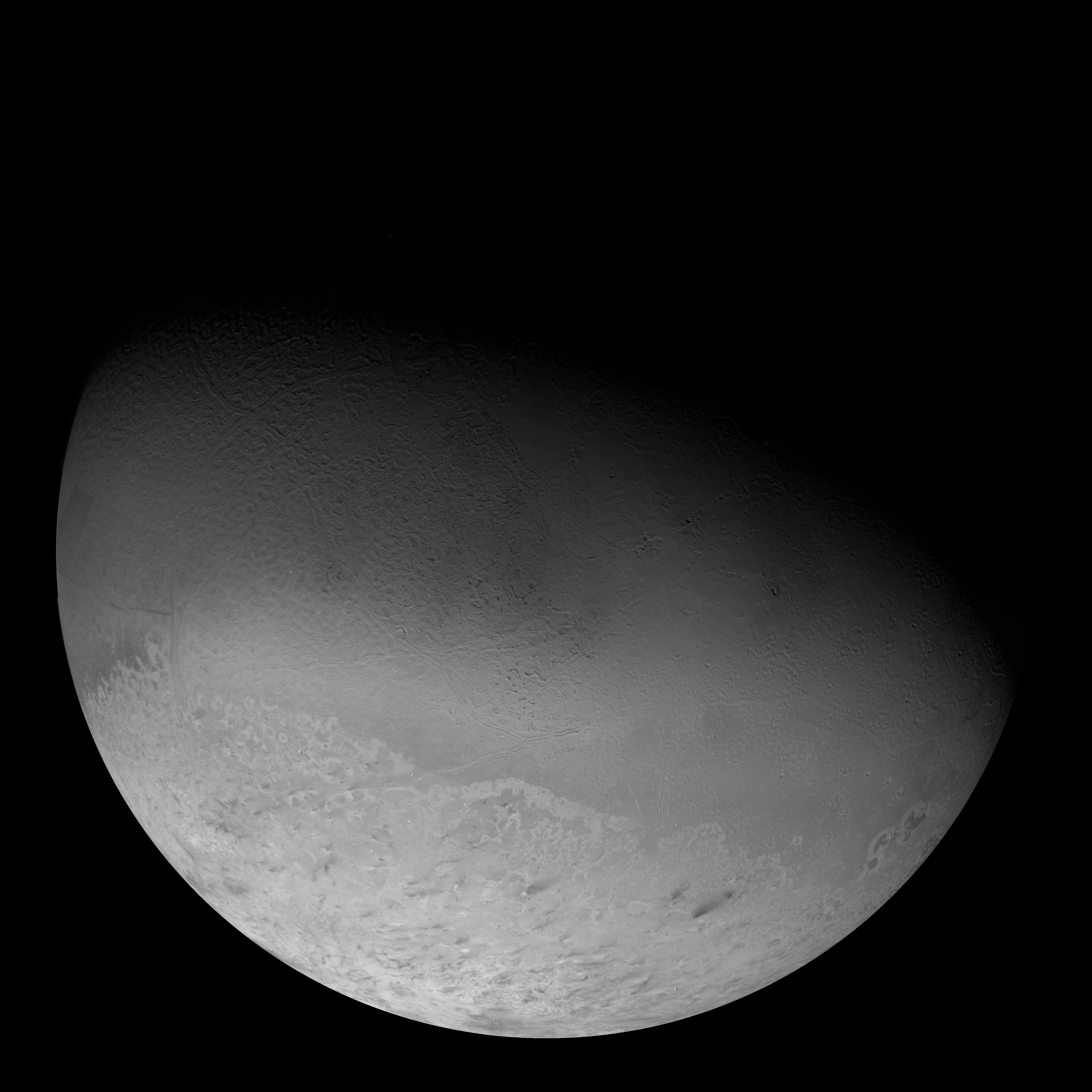
Neptune's moon Triton

== See also ==
- New Horizons probe, performed a Pluto flyby in 2015
- New Horizons 2
