= SMARA (spacecraft) =

Proposed mission concept to Jupiter

SMAll Reconnaissance of Atmospheres (SMARA)
- An artist depiction of the spacecraft.

Start of mission
- Launch date: 2030 (proposed)

SMARA (SMAll Reconnaissance of Atmospheres) is a proposed mission concept to the planet Jupiter. The mission would involve a swarm of tiny probes each weighing less than 1 kilogram which would zip through the clouds of Jupiter by 2030, in conjunction with the ESA's Jupiter Icy Moons Explorer mission, beaming home data about the gas giant's dense atmosphere. According to estimates, a probe can survive for up to 15 minutes in the atmosphere of Jupiter and transmit enough information to give scientists a greater understanding of that atmosphere. They will each transmit 20 megabits of data in total. The mission is named after the wind borne fruit released by maple trees.

== Instruments ==
Much smaller probes, made possible by the miniaturization of electronics, cameras and other instruments, would survive the fall through Jupiter's atmosphere for much longer without a parachute, according to John Moores. NASA's robotic Galileo probe, which dived into Jupiter in 1995, had no camera, so the swarm of microprobes would represent the first look at Jupiter with a resolution greater than 15 kilometers per pixel.

== Sciences ==
It is believed that the Jovian atmosphere could be a historical record for celestial objects that vaporize in its atmosphere, providing data about the composition of the Solar System. Since the atmosphere of Jupiter is the deepest among all the planets in the Solar System, it can help experts better understand flow dynamics, cloud microphysics and radiative transfer under conditions far different than those on Earth.
