= Shensuo =

Proposed Chinese interstellar space probes

- Mission type: Heliosphere science, planetary flyby
- Operator: Chinese National Space Administration
- Mission duration: 25 years (planned)

Shensuo (Chinese: 神梭; pinyin: Shénsuō), formerly Interstellar Express, is a proposed Chinese National Space Administration program designed to explore the heliosphere and interstellar space. The program will feature two space probes that were initially planned to be launched in 2024 and follow differing trajectories to encounter Jupiter to assist them out of the Solar System. As of 2026, the mission calls for two launches in 2032 and 2033, to the "tail" and "nose" structures of the stellar-wind bubble, respectively.

The probes are proposed for launch on the Long March 5 and will require China to develop a space-based thermoelectric fission reactor. Flybys of Saturn, Uranus and Neptune, are possible, but the focus is on gravity assists from Earth and Jupiter, and heliosphere science.

== Background ==
The heliosphere and the interstellar medium have so far been explored by only three NASA probes: Voyager 1, Voyager 2 and New Horizons. Both Voyagers used gravity assists to take them out of the plane of the ecliptic: Voyager 1 to the north with Saturn in 1980, and Voyager 2 to the south with Neptune in 1989. New Horizons was designed to stay within the plane to allow for exploration of other Kuiper belt objects. However, none of these probes are exploring the tail of the heliosphere; Pioneer 10, which was headed toward the tail after its Jupiter flyby in 1973, lost contact with Earth in 2003. Later spacecraft which would remain within the Solar System, such as Cassini–Huygens, have gathered valuable data on the heliosphere and how it interacts with the interstellar medium, suggesting that the heliosphere is not shaped like a comet but is rather spherical.

== Project history ==
=== Initial proposal (2019-2024) ===
Each probe is to weigh about 200 kilograms, to use radioisotope thermoelectric generators for power, and to carry 50 kilograms or more of scientific instruments such as optical cameras, magnetometers, dust detectors, and neutral atom and particle payloads. They will also study anomalous cosmic rays, interplanetary dust and the interstellar medium. Depending on whether monopropellant or ion propulsion is used, the probes would be launched using either Long March 3B or Long March 5 rockets. While IHP-1 and IHP-2 will use RTGs for power, IHP-3, if approved, would use a nuclear reactor.

The dwarf planet Quaoar and its moon Weywot were considered as potential flyby targets for IHP-1. Centaur exploration has also been considered for both probes.

While a 2024 launch date was targeted, the COVID-19 pandemic has caused some delays, which rendered it to launch at a later date. Future dates of 2026 launches have been considered.

The stated goal of the spacecraft was to travel a total of 100 astronomical units by 2049, which is the centennial celebration of the People's Republic of China's founding.

If IHP-1 would have been launched in May 2024, it was planned to return to Earth in October 2025 for a gravity assist, then loop back in December 2027 for yet another gravity assist before flying by Jupiter in March 2029 to proceed on a trajectory toward the nose of the heliosphere and potentially make observations of centaurs or Kuiper belt objects, including the flyby of Quaoar, along the way.

IHP-2 was expected to launch before May 2026 and was proposed to receive two gravity assists from Earth in May 2027 and March 2032, respectively. A flyby of Jupiter in May 2033 is then proposed to send it on a path to fly by Neptune in January 2038 at only 1,000 kilometers above its cloud tops. The probe may also release an atmospheric impactor prior to the flyby.

If IHP-2 launch combines with another planned Chinese interplanetary mission Tianwen-4, there may be a chance for comparative planetology in some form because IHP-2's proposed flyby of Neptune and Triton in 2038 and Tianwen-4's possible additional probe for Uranus flyby could also be in 2039, allowing for comparisons of similar planetary cohorts within short span of few years. Earlier IHP-1's Quaoar flyby was also planned to occur in 2040.

==== Scientific payload ====
The probes were proposed to carry the following suite of instruments:

Instrument	Dimension, range, resolution
Vector Atomic Magnetometer	Electromagnetic radiation: 8–70,000 nT; sensitive to 0.001–0.05 nT/Hz^{1/2}, accurate to 0.005–3 nT
Plasma Analyzer	Plasma wave observations: 0.005–30 keV, resolution 8%
Pick-up Ion Analyzer	Ion counter: 0.002–40 keV/e, energy resolution 5%; mass resolution of H+, He+, He2+, N+, O+, Ne+
High Energy Particle Analyzer	Ionization analysis: Protons, 7–300 MeV; Electrons, 200 keV – 10 MeV; Heavy ions, 10–300 MeV/n
Energetic Particle Analyzer	Ionization analysis: Protons, 20 keV – 7 MeV; Electrons, 20–400 keV; Heavy ions, 0.5–20 MeV/n
Energetic Neutral Atom Analyzer	Images emission of energetic neutral atoms; ~1–100 keV H
Dust Particle Analyzer	Dust analysis: 400 cm^{2} area, 10^{−17}–10^{−9} kg range, 1 – 10^{3} km/s impact, 10^{−16}–10^{−13} charge
Camera	Narrow-angle: 1,200 mm focal length, 150 mm aperture; 0.78°×1.05° FOV, 40–1,000 nm wavelength, 6–8 spectra channels Mid-angle: 150 mm focal length, 37.5 mm aperture, 6.28°×8.34° FOV, 460–1,000 nm wavelength, 6–8 spectra channels Wide-angle (4×); 38 mm focal length, 20 mm aperture, 30°×23.4° FOV, 600–1,000 nm wavelength
UV photometer	Ultraviolet mapping: 121.6 nm, 58.4 nm wavelength, 4°×4° FOV
Infrared spectrometer	Infrared mapping: 1–16 μm spectrum range, 9 cm^{−1} spectrum resolution, 0.5° FOV

=== Heliosphere-focused probes (2025) ===
In 2025, China's Journal of Deep Space Exploration published a paper outlining the Solar System Boundary Exploration Mission: two probes are proposed to be launched towards the "tail" and "nose" structures of the stellar-wind bubble, in 2032 and 2033, respectively. The probes would require development of a thermoelectric fission reactor, and launch on the Long March 5 from Wenchang Space Launch Site. While the paper notes the potential for a Neptune flyby during the nose mission, and either a Saturn or Uranus flyby during the tail mission, the focus is on an Earth-Jupiter or Earth-Earth-Jupiter flyby scheme.

== See also ==
- Interstellar Probe, a concept by NASA to explore the heliosphere to be launched sometime in the 2030s.
- Trident, a concept by NASA to explore Neptune and Triton, which would have been launched in 2025 on a trajectory to reach Triton in mid-2038.
- Neptune Odyssey, a concept by NASA designed to orbit Neptune and Triton that may carry an atmospheric probe as part of its cargo.
