= New Horizons 2 =

Proposed NASA mission

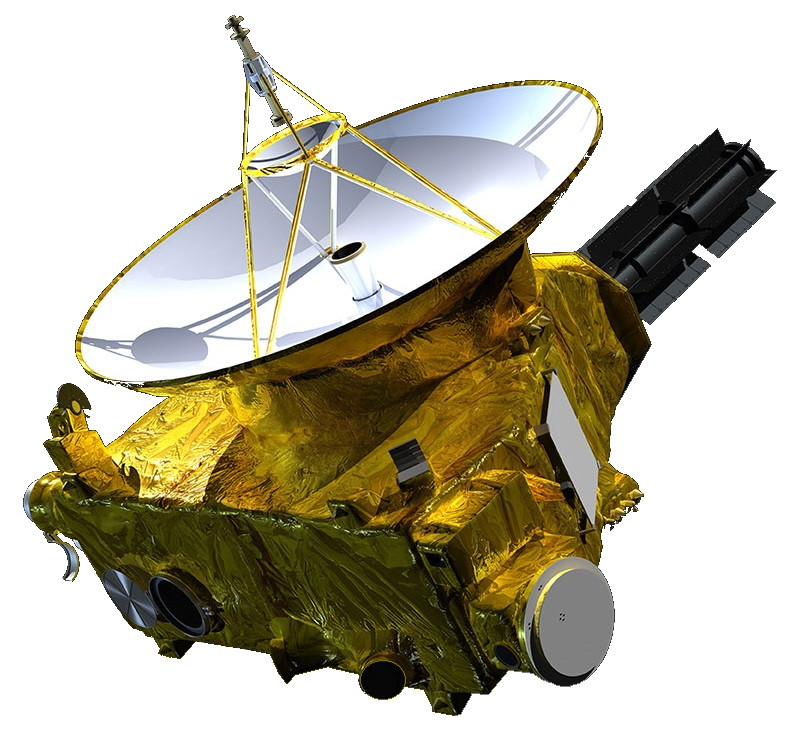
Design of the first New Horizons spacecraft

New Horizons 2 (also New Horizons II, NHII, or NH2) was a proposed mission to the trans-Neptunian objects by NASA. It was conceived as a planetary flyby mission in 2002, based on the New Horizons spacecraft, which was in development at the time. In March 2005, the proposal was not selected for further development because of a shortage of plutonium-238 needed for the radioisotope thermoelectric generator (RTG). The New Horizons 2 study was funded by the New Frontiers program, and delivered to the U.S. Congress in June 2005.

== Description ==
New Horizons 2 was included in the tentative budget for the New Frontiers program missions. In 2004, the United States Senate on Appropriations Committee provided additional funding for New Horizons 2, a new Kuiper belt mission. As early as 2004, there was a conference on how to make the most use of New Horizons 2's Uranus flyby.

Candidate targets included 47171 Lempo, a system that, like Pluto–Charon, contains multiple bodies. The mission plan for Lempo also included flybys of Jupiter and Uranus, and perhaps four Kuiper belt objects (KBO). There was a lot of flexibility: even without a gravity assist, any KBO within 50 AU and a 20-year flight time was possible. A flyby of Neptune's largest moon Triton was also considered, with 66652 Borasisi as a potential follow-on. 55637 Uni was also considered for a visit, as it had a similar orbit to Lempo.

== See also ==
- Innovative Interstellar Explorer (2003 concept study for RTG powered ion-engined probe to 200 AU by 2030)
- List of New Horizons topics
