= Juno (spacecraft) =

Second NASA orbiter mission to Jupiter launched in 2011

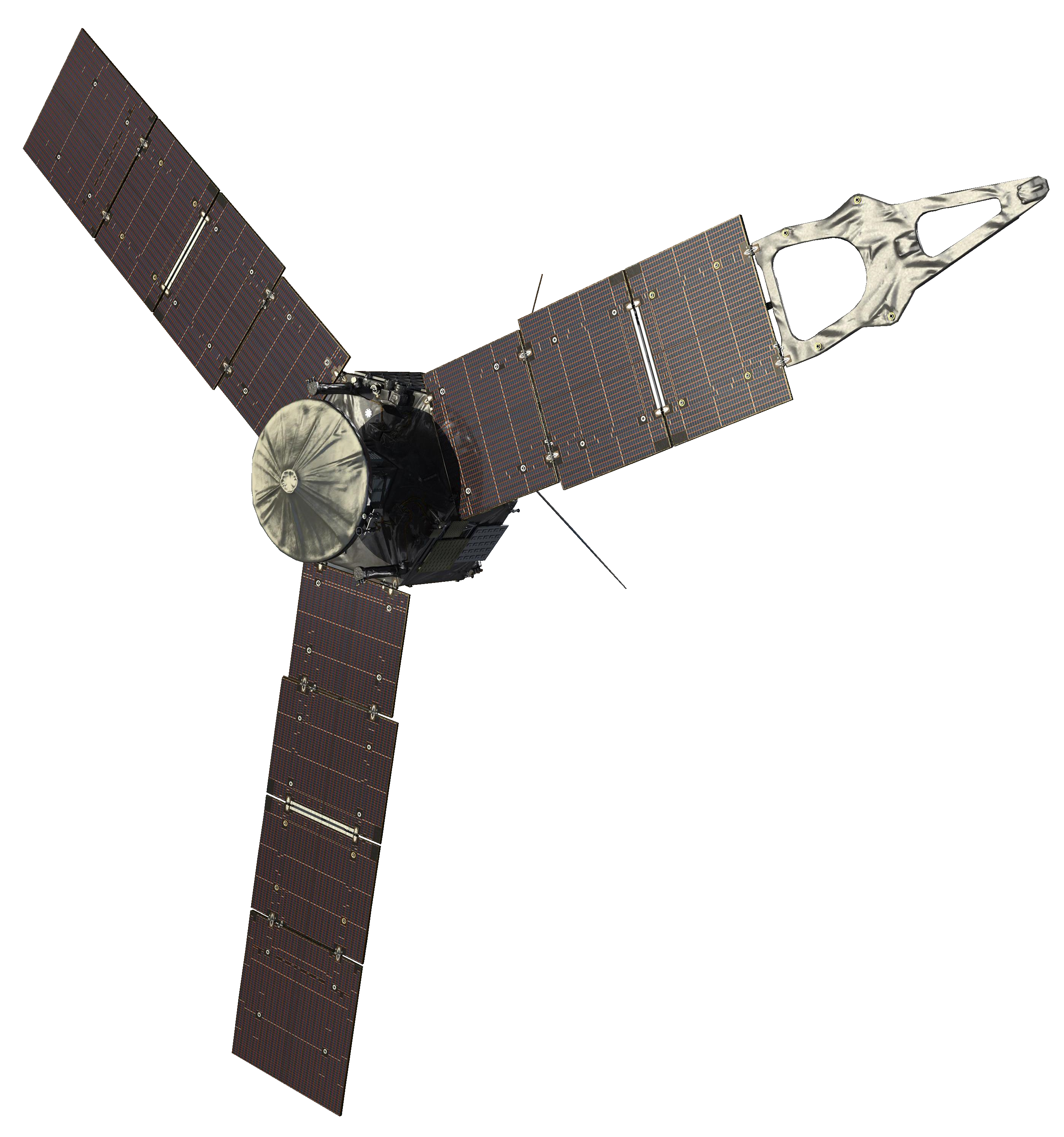
- Artist's rendering of the Juno spacecraft
- Names: New Frontiers 2
- Mission type: Jupiter orbiter
- Operator: NASA / Jet Propulsion Laboratory
- COSPAR ID: 2011-040A
- SATCAT no.: 37773
- Website: www.nasa.gov/mission_pages/juno/main/index.html (NASA); www.missionjuno.swri.edu (SwRI)
- Mission duration: Total: 7 years (planned); 15 years, 106 days (elapsed); Cruise: 4 years, 335 days; Prime mission: 2 years (planned); 5 years, 16 days; Extended mission: 5 years, 121 days (elapsed) (Note: The mission extension was officially expected to last only until 17 September 2025, or until end of life)

Spacecraft properties
- Manufacturer: Lockheed Martin Space
- Launch mass: 3,625 kg (7,992 lb)
- Dry mass: 1,593 kg (3,512 lb)
- Dimensions: 20.1 × 4.6 m (66 × 15 ft)
- Power: 14 kW at Earth, 435 W at Jupiter; 2 × 60-ampere hour, 28 Volt lithium-ion batteries

Start of mission
- Launch date: August 5, 2011, 16:25:00 UTC
- Rocket: Atlas V 551 (AV-029)
- Launch site: Cape Canaveral, SLC-41
- Contractor: United Launch Alliance

Flyby of Earth
- Closest approach: October 9, 2013
- Distance: 559 km (347 mi)

Jupiter orbiter
- Orbital insertion: July 5, 2016, 10 years, 4 months, 14 days ago
- Orbits: 76 (planned)

Orbital parameters
- Perijove altitude: 4,200 km (2,600 mi) altitude 75,600 km (47,000 mi) radius
- Apojove altitude: 8.1×10^{6} km (5.0×10^{6} mi)
- Inclination: 90° (polar orbit)
Instruments
- MWR: Microwave Radiometer
- JIRAM: Jovian Infrared Auroral Mapper
- MAG: Magnetometer
- GRAV: Gravity Science
- JADE: Jovian Auroral Distributions Experiment
- JEDI: Jovian Energetic Particle Detector Instrument
- Waves: Radio and Plasma Wave Sensor
- UVS: Ultraviolet Imaging Spectrograph
- Juno mission patch New Frontiers

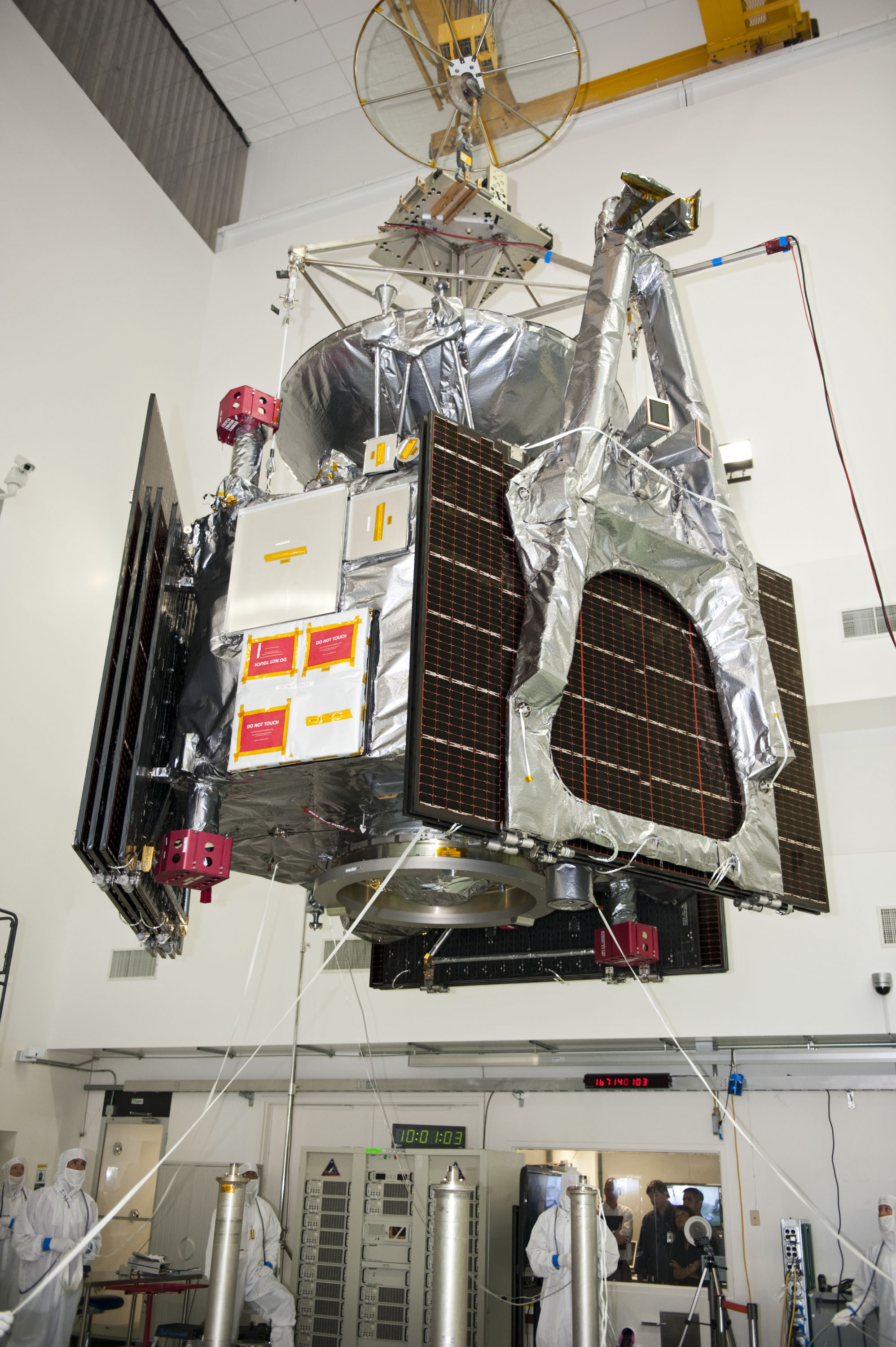
Juno in launch configuration

Juno is a NASA space probe orbiting the planet Jupiter. Built by Lockheed Martin and operated by NASA's Jet Propulsion Laboratory, the spacecraft was launched from Cape Canaveral Air Force Station on August 5, 2011, 16:25:00 UTC, as part of the New Frontiers program. Juno entered a polar orbit of Jupiter on July 5, 2016, 03:53:00 UTC, to begin a scientific investigation of the planet. After completing its mission, Juno was originally planned to be intentionally deorbited into Jupiter's atmosphere, but has since been approved to continue orbiting until contact is lost with the spacecraft. It will continue to explore Jupiter to study Jovian rings and the inner moons area, which is not well explored; this phase will also include close flybys of the moons Thebe, Amalthea, Adrastea, and Metis.

Juno's mission is to measure Jupiter's composition, gravitational field, magnetic field, and polar magnetosphere. It also searches for clues about how the planet formed, including whether it has a rocky core, the amount of water present within the deep atmosphere, mass distribution, and its deep winds, which can reach speeds up to 620 km/h (390 mph).

Juno is the second spacecraft to orbit Jupiter, after the Galileo orbiter, which orbited from 1995 to 2003. Unlike all earlier spacecraft sent to the outer Solar System and beyond—which used radioisotope thermoelectric generators for power—Juno is powered by solar panels, more commonly used by satellites orbiting Earth and working in the inner Solar System. Accordingly, Juno required the three largest solar panel wings ever deployed on a planetary probe (at the time of launching). These play an integral role in stabilizing the spacecraft as well as generating power.

As of November 14, 2026, Juno remained operational and in contact with Earth through the NASA Deep Space Network.

== Naming ==
Juno's name comes from Greek and Roman mythology. The god Jupiter drew a veil of clouds around himself to hide his mischief, and his wife, the goddess Juno, was able to peer through the clouds and reveal Jupiter's true nature.

A NASA compilation of mission names and acronyms referred to the mission by the backronym Jupiter Near-polar Orbiter. However the project itself has consistently described it as a name with mythological associations and not an acronym. The spacecraft's current name is in reference to the Roman goddess Juno. Juno is sometimes called the New Frontiers 2 as the second mission in the New Frontiers program, but is not to be confused with New Horizons 2, a proposed but unselected New Frontiers mission.

== Overview ==
Juno's interplanetary trajectory; tick marks at 30-day intervals.

Juno spacecraft trajectory animation

Animation of Juno's trajectory from August 5, 2011 Juno · Earth · Mars · Jupiter

Juno was selected on June 1, 2005, as the next New Frontiers mission after New Horizons. The desire for a Jupiter probe was strong in the years prior to this, but there had not been any approved missions. The Discovery Program had passed over the somewhat similar but more limited Interior Structure and Internal Dynamical Evolution of Jupiter (INSIDE Jupiter) proposal, and the turn-of-the-century era Europa Orbiter was canceled in 2002. The flagship-level Europa Jupiter System Mission was in the works in the early 2000s, but funding issues resulted in it evolving into ESA's Jupiter Icy Moons Explorer.

Juno completed a five-year cruise to Jupiter, arriving on July 5, 2016. The spacecraft traveled a total distance of roughly 2.8×10^{9} km (19 AU; 1.7×10^{9} mi) to reach Jupiter. The spacecraft was designed to orbit Jupiter 37 times over the course of its mission. This was originally planned to take 20 months.

Juno's trajectory used a gravity assist speed boost from Earth, accomplished by an Earth flyby in October 2013, two years after its launch on August 5, 2011. The spacecraft performed an orbit insertion burn to slow it enough to allow capture. It was expected to make three 53-day orbits before performing another burn on December 11, 2016, that would bring it into a 14-day polar orbit called the Science Orbit. Because of a suspected problem in Juno's main engine, the burn scheduled on December 11, 2016, was cancelled and Juno remained in its 53-day orbit until the first Ganymede encounter of its Extended Mission. This extended mission began with a flyby of Ganymede on June 7, 2021. Subsequent flybys of Europa and then Io decreased the orbital period to 33 days by February 2024.

During the science mission, infrared and microwave instruments will measure the thermal radiation emanating from deep within Jupiter's atmosphere. These observations will complement previous studies of its composition by assessing the abundance and distribution of water, and therefore oxygen. This data will provide insight into Jupiter's origins. Juno will also investigate the convection that drives natural circulation patterns in Jupiter's atmosphere. Other instruments aboard Juno will gather data about its gravitational field and polar magnetosphere. The Juno mission was planned to conclude in February 2018 after completing 37 orbits of Jupiter, but now has been commissioned through 2025 to do a further 42 additional orbits of Jupiter as well as close flybys of Ganymede, Europa and Io. The probe was then intended to be deorbited and burnt up in Jupiter's outer atmosphere to avoid any possibility of impact and biological contamination of one of its moons.

=== Flight trajectory ===
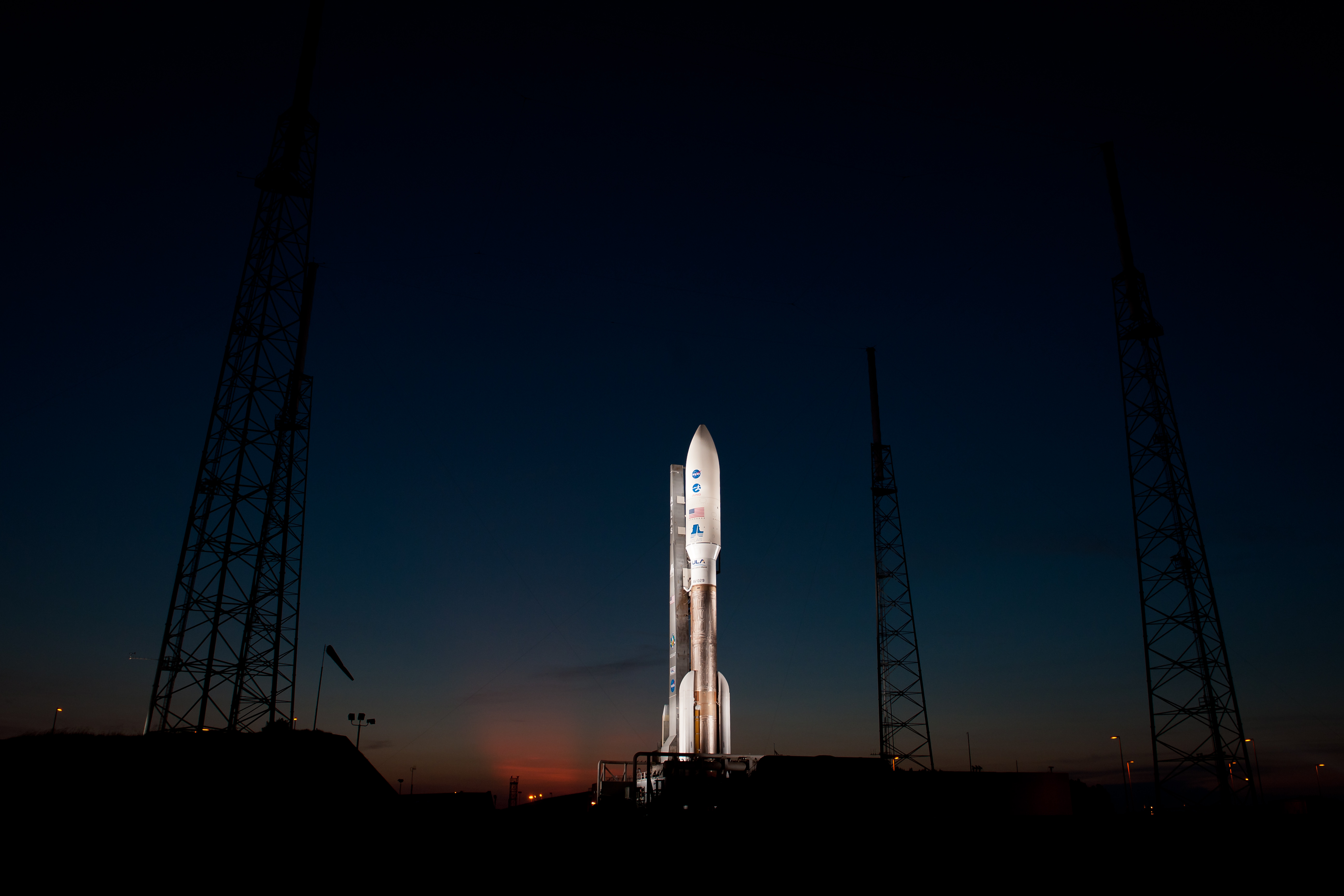
Juno awaiting its launch in 2011

==== Launch ====
Juno was launched atop an Atlas V (551 configuration) at Cape Canaveral Air Force Station (CCAFS), Florida on August 5, 2011, 16:25:00 UTC. The Atlas V (AV-029) used a Russian-built RD-180 main engine, powered by kerosene and liquid oxygen. The main engine ignited and underwent checkout then, 3.8 seconds later, the five strap-on solid rocket boosters (SRBs) ignited. Following the SRB burnout, about 93 seconds into the flight, two of the spent boosters fell away from the vehicle, followed 1.5 seconds later by the remaining three. When heating levels had dropped below predetermined limits, the payload fairing that protected Juno during launch and transit through the thickest part of the atmosphere separated, about 3 minutes 24 seconds into the flight. The Atlas V main engine cut off 4 minutes 26 seconds after liftoff. Sixteen seconds later, the Centaur second stage ignited, and it burned for about 6 minutes, putting the satellite into an initial parking orbit. The vehicle coasted for about 30 minutes, and then the Centaur was reignited for a second firing of 9 minutes, placing the spacecraft on an Earth escape trajectory in a heliocentric orbit.

Prior to separation, the Centaur stage used onboard reaction engines to spin Juno up to 1.4 r.p.m. About 54 minutes after launch, the spacecraft separated from the Centaur and began to extend its solar panels. Following the full deployment and locking of the solar panels, Juno's batteries began to recharge. Deployment of the solar panels reduced Juno's spin rate by two-thirds. The probe is spun to ensure stability during the voyage and so that all instruments on the probe are able to observe Jupiter.

The voyage to Jupiter took five years, and included two orbital maneuvers in August and September 2012 and a flyby of the Earth on October 9, 2013. When it reached the Jovian system, Juno had traveled approximately 19 astronomical units (2.8 billion kilometres).

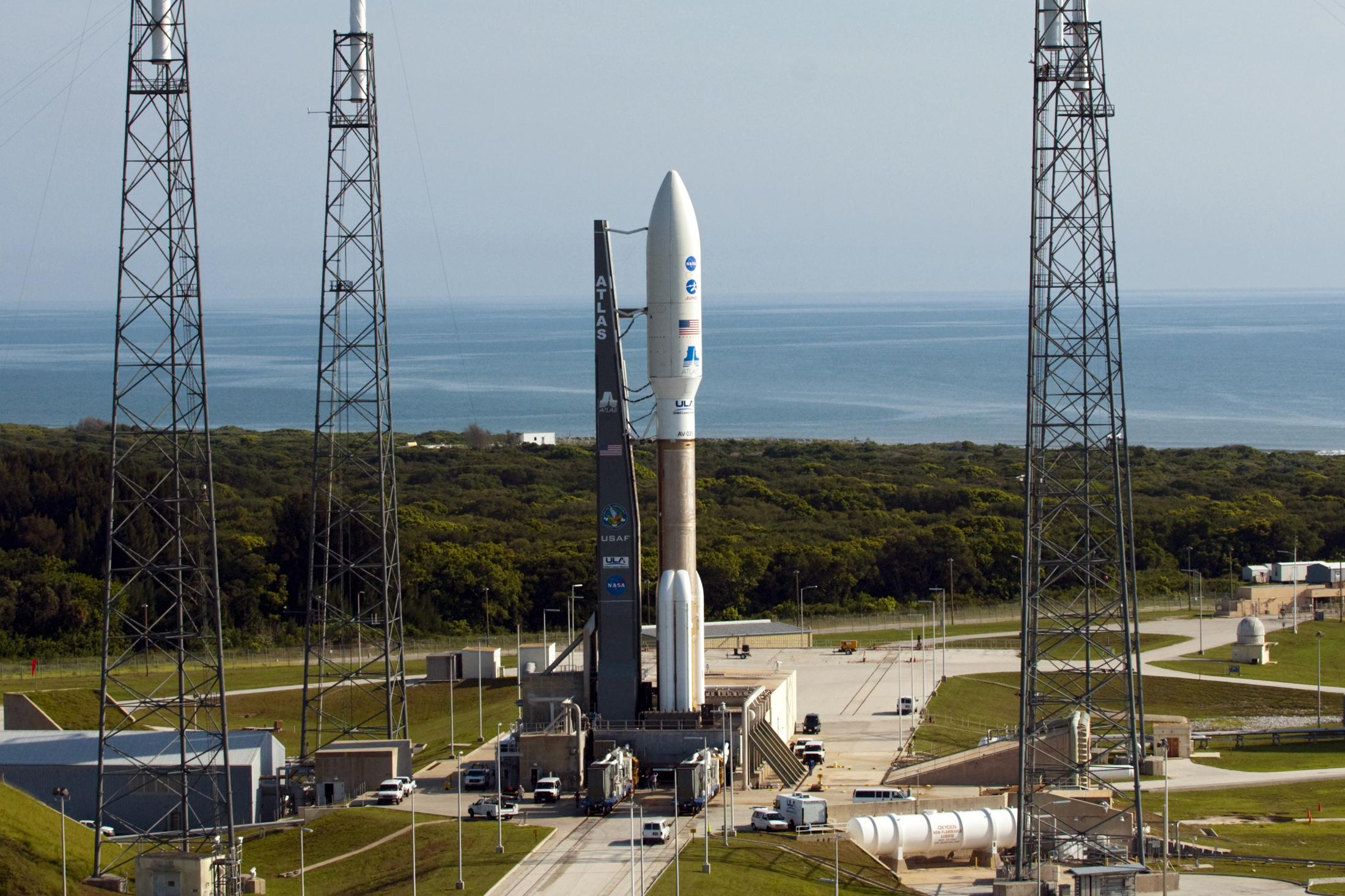
Atlas V on launch pad

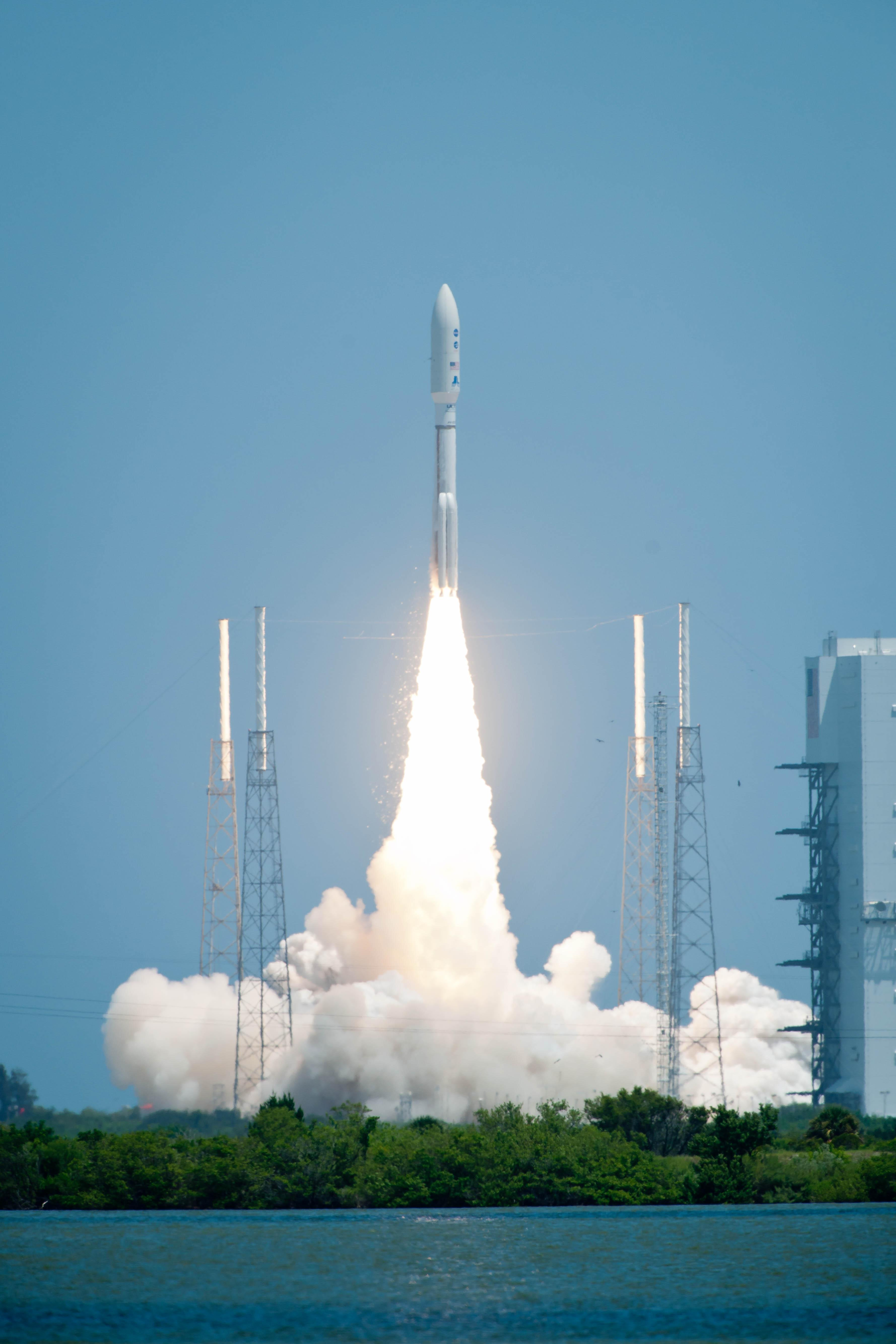
Lift-off

Launch video

==== Deep space maneuvers and flyby of the Earth ====
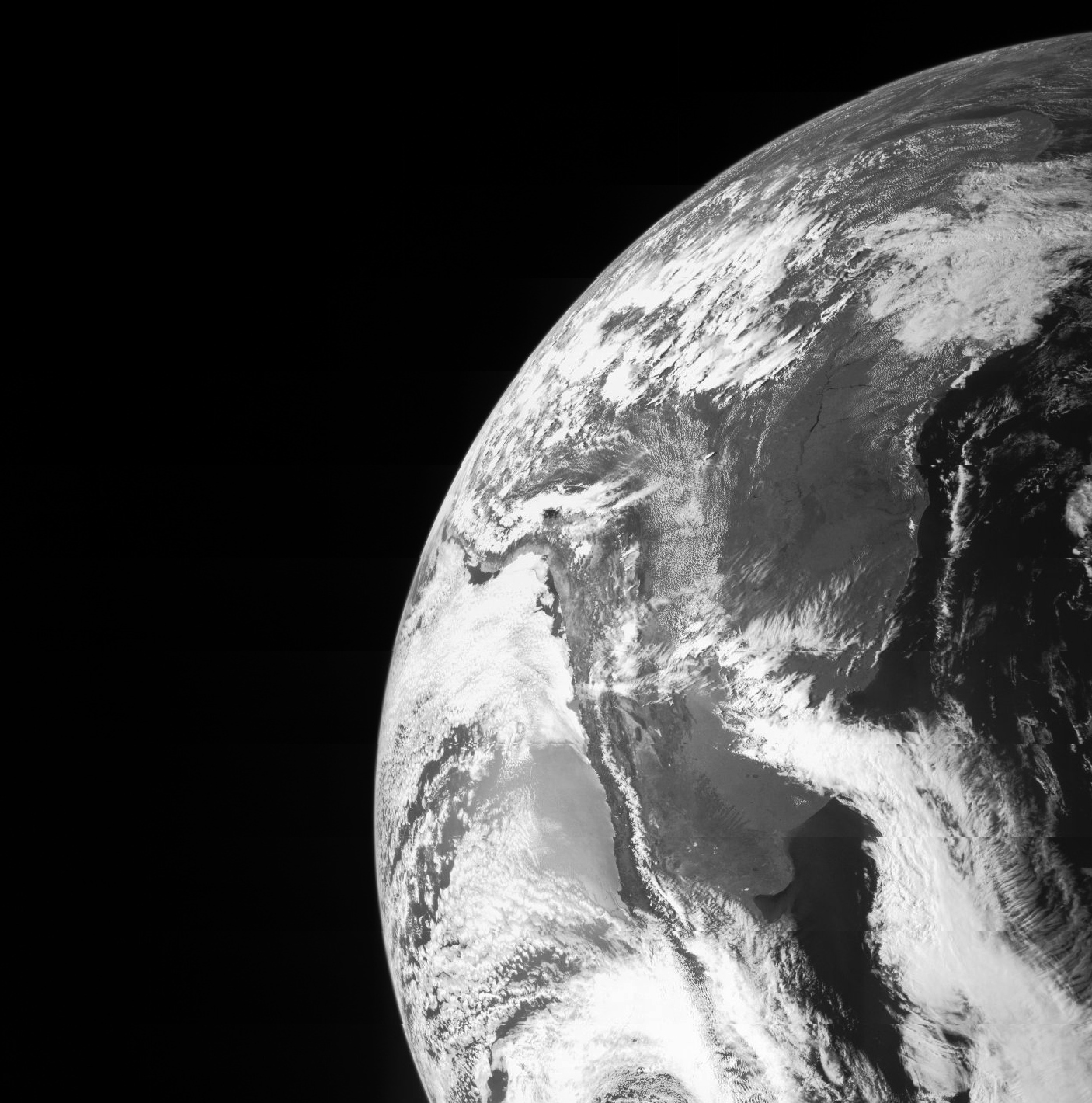
South America as seen by JunoCam on its October 2013 Earth flyby

Video of Earth and Moon taken by the Juno spacecraft

After traveling for about a year in an elliptical heliocentric orbit, Juno performed two deep space maneuvers (DSMs), firing its engine twice near aphelion (beyond the orbit of Mars) to change its orbit and return to pass by the Earth at a distance of 559 kilometers in October 2013. The combination of the DSMs and the resulting Earth flyby helped Juno slingshot itself toward the Jovian system in a maneuver called a gravity assist. The spacecraft received a boost in speed of more than 3.9 km/s (8,700 mph), and it was set on a course to Jupiter. The flyby was also used as a rehearsal for the Juno science team to test some instruments and practice certain procedures before the arrival at Jupiter.

==== Insertion into Jovian orbit ====
Jupiter's gravity accelerated the approaching spacecraft to around 210,000 km/h (130,000 mph). On July 5, 2016, between 03:18 and 03:53 UTC Earth-received time, an insertion burn lasting 2,102 seconds decelerated Juno by 542 m/s (1,780 ft/s) and changed its trajectory from a hyperbolic flyby to an elliptical polar orbit with a period of about 53.5 days. The spacecraft successfully entered Jovian orbit on July 5, 2016, at 03:53 UTC.

==== Orbit and environment ====
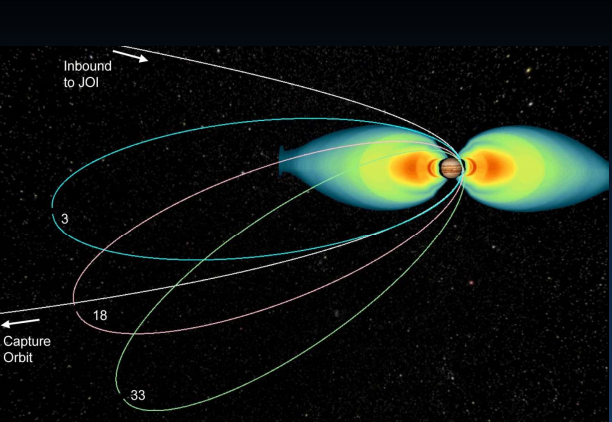
Juno's elliptical orbit and the Jovian radiation belts

Juno's highly elliptical initial polar orbit takes it within 4,200 km (2,600 mi) of the planet and out to 8.1×10^{6} km (5.0×10^{6} mi), far beyond Callisto's orbit. An eccentricity-reducing burn, called the Period Reduction Maneuver, was planned that would drop the probe into a much shorter 14-day science orbit. Originally, Juno was expected to complete 37 orbits over 20 months before the end of its mission. Due to problems with helium valves that are important during main engine burns, mission managers announced on February 17, 2017, that Juno would remain in its original 53-day orbit, since the chance of an engine misfire putting the spacecraft into a bad orbit was too high. Juno completed only 12 science orbits before the end of its budgeted mission plan, ending July 2018. In June 2018, NASA extended the mission through July 2021.

The orbits were carefully planned in order to minimize contact with Jupiter's dense radiation belts, which can damage spacecraft electronics and solar panels, by exploiting a gap in the radiation envelope near the planet, passing through a region of minimal radiation. The Juno Radiation Vault, with 1-centimeter-thick titanium walls (three times as thick as the Galileo spacecraft body's), also aids in protecting Juno's electronics by reducing the incoming radiation by a factor of 800. Despite the intense radiation, JunoCam and the Jovian Infrared Auroral Mapper (JIRAM) were designed to endure at least eight orbits, while the Microwave Radiometer (MWR) was made to endure at least eleven orbits. All instruments are operational as of perijove 71. Although the flux of electrons close to Jupiter is about ten times as high as it is around Jupiter's moon Europa, Juno will still receive a lower total dose of radiation in its polar orbit (20 Mrad through end of mission) than the Galileo orbiter received in its equatorial orbit. Galileo's subsystems were damaged by radiation during its mission, including an LED in its data recording system.

=== Orbital operations ===
Animation of Juno's trajectory around Jupiter from June 1, 2016, to October 1, 2028 Juno · Jupiter

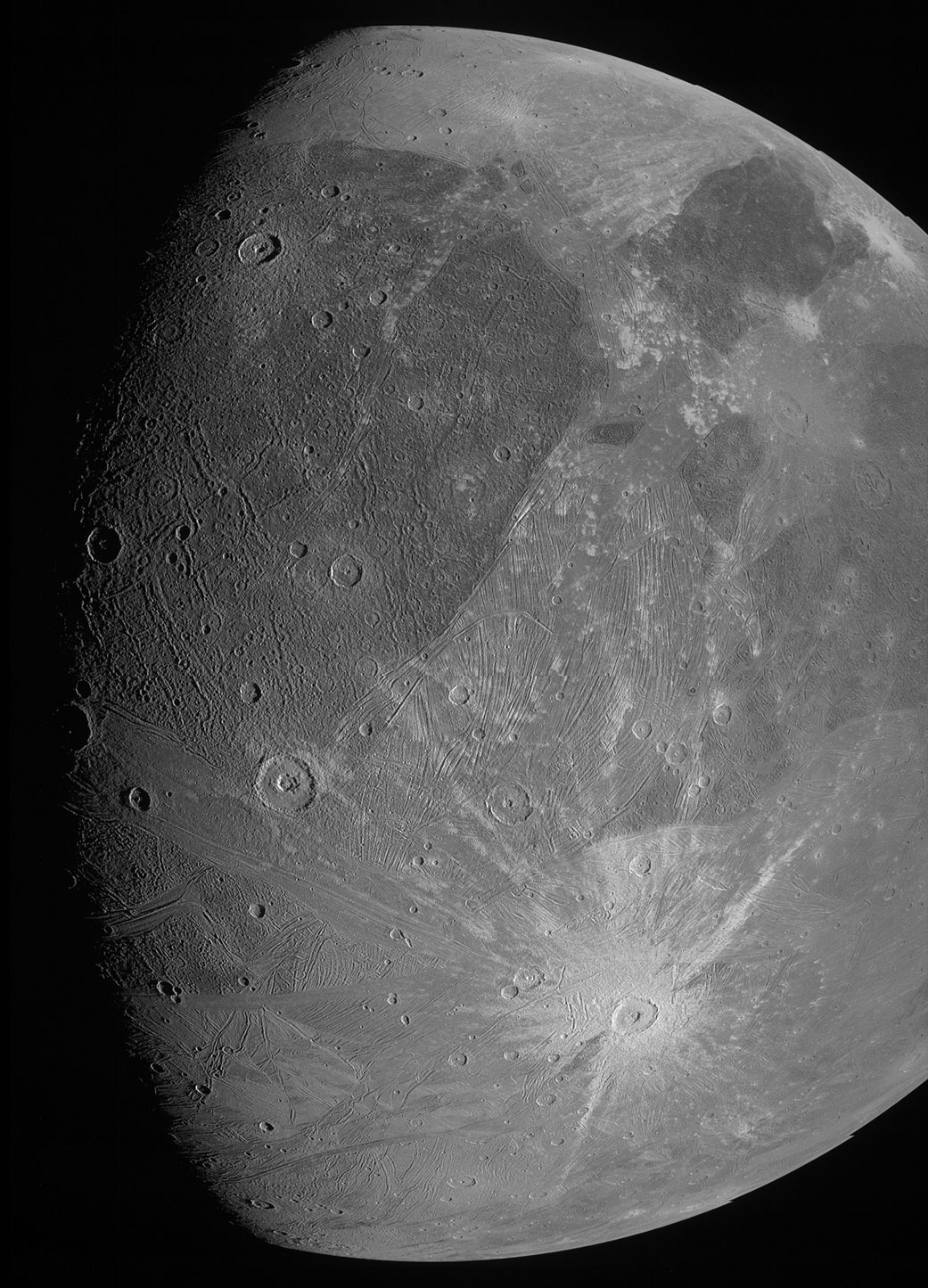
Ganymede, photographed on 7 June 2021 by Juno during its extended mission

The spacecraft completed its first flyby of Jupiter (perijove 1) on August 26, 2016, and captured the first images of the planet's north pole.

On October 14, 2016, days prior to perijove 2 and the planned Period Reduction Maneuver, telemetry showed that some of Juno's helium valves were not opening properly. On October 18, 2016, some 13 hours before its second close approach to Jupiter, Juno entered into safe mode, an operational mode engaged when its onboard computer encounters unexpected conditions. The spacecraft powered down all non-critical systems and reoriented itself to face the Sun to gather the most power. Due to this, no science operations were conducted during perijove 2.

On December 11, 2016, the spacecraft completed perijove 3, with all but one instrument operating and returning data. One instrument, JIRAM, was off pending a flight software update. Perijove 4 occurred on February 2, 2017, with all instruments operating. Perijove 5 occurred on March 27, 2017. Perijove 6 took place on May 19, 2017.

Although the mission's lifetime is inherently limited by radiation exposure, almost all of this dose was planned to be acquired during the perijoves. As of 2017, the 53.4 day orbit was planned to be maintained through July 2018 for a total of twelve science-gathering perijoves. At the end of this prime mission, the project was planned to go through a science review process by NASA's Planetary Science Division to determine if it will receive funding for an extended mission. In June 2018, NASA extended the mission operations plan to July 2021.

==== Extended missions ====
In January 2021, NASA extended the mission operations to September 2025. In this phase Juno began to examine Jupiter's major moons, Ganymede, Europa and Io. A flyby of Ganymede occurred on June 7, 2021, 17:35 UTC, coming within 1,038 km (645 mi), the closest any spacecraft has come to the moon since Galileo in 2000. A flyby of Europa took place on September 29, 2022, at a distance of 352 km (219 mi). Juno performed two flybys of Io on December 30, 2023, and February 3, 2024, gathering observational data on volcanic activity. From April 2024, Juno will begin a series of experiments to learn more about Jupiter's interior shape and structure.

Juno's second extended mission (EM2) began in October 2025 with a planned three-year duration. Principal Investigator Scott Bolton noted "The new mission provides opportunities for Juno to unexplore new regions in the Jovian system, and to follow up on Juno's discoveries made during its prime and 1st extended missions. [...] During EM2, Juno will dive deep within Jupiter's inner radiation belts where the rings and inner moons reside. EM2 provides an opportunity for a thorough investigation of these components and their complex interaction, providing a unique data set to compare with other giant planet ring systems, including the ice giants."

==== Planned deorbit and disintegration ====
NASA originally planned to deorbit the spacecraft into the atmosphere of Jupiter after completing 32 orbits of Jupiter. The controlled deorbit was intended to eliminate space debris and risks of contamination of possible life-bearing moons (especially Europa) by surviving terrestrial microorganisms onboard the spacecraft in accordance with NASA's planetary protection guidelines. NASA has since extended the mission twice, first to September 2025 and again to September 2028 and no deorbit is planned.

=== Team ===
Scott Bolton of the Southwest Research Institute in San Antonio, Texas is the principal investigator and is responsible for all aspects of the mission. The Jet Propulsion Laboratory in California manages the mission and the Lockheed Martin Corporation was responsible for the spacecraft development and construction. The mission is being carried out with the participation of several institutional partners. Coinvestigators include Toby Owen of the University of Hawaii, Andrew Ingersoll of California Institute of Technology, Frances Bagenal of the University of Colorado at Boulder, and Candy Hansen of the Planetary Science Institute. Jack Connerney of the Goddard Space Flight Center served as instrument lead.

=== Cost ===
Juno was originally proposed at a cost of approximately US$700 million (fiscal year 2003) for a launch in June 2009 (equivalent to US$1225 million in 2025). NASA budgetary restrictions resulted in postponement until August 2011, and a launch on board an Atlas V rocket in the 551 configuration. As of 2019 the mission was projected to cost US$1.46 billion for operations and data analysis through 2022.

=== Scientific objectives ===
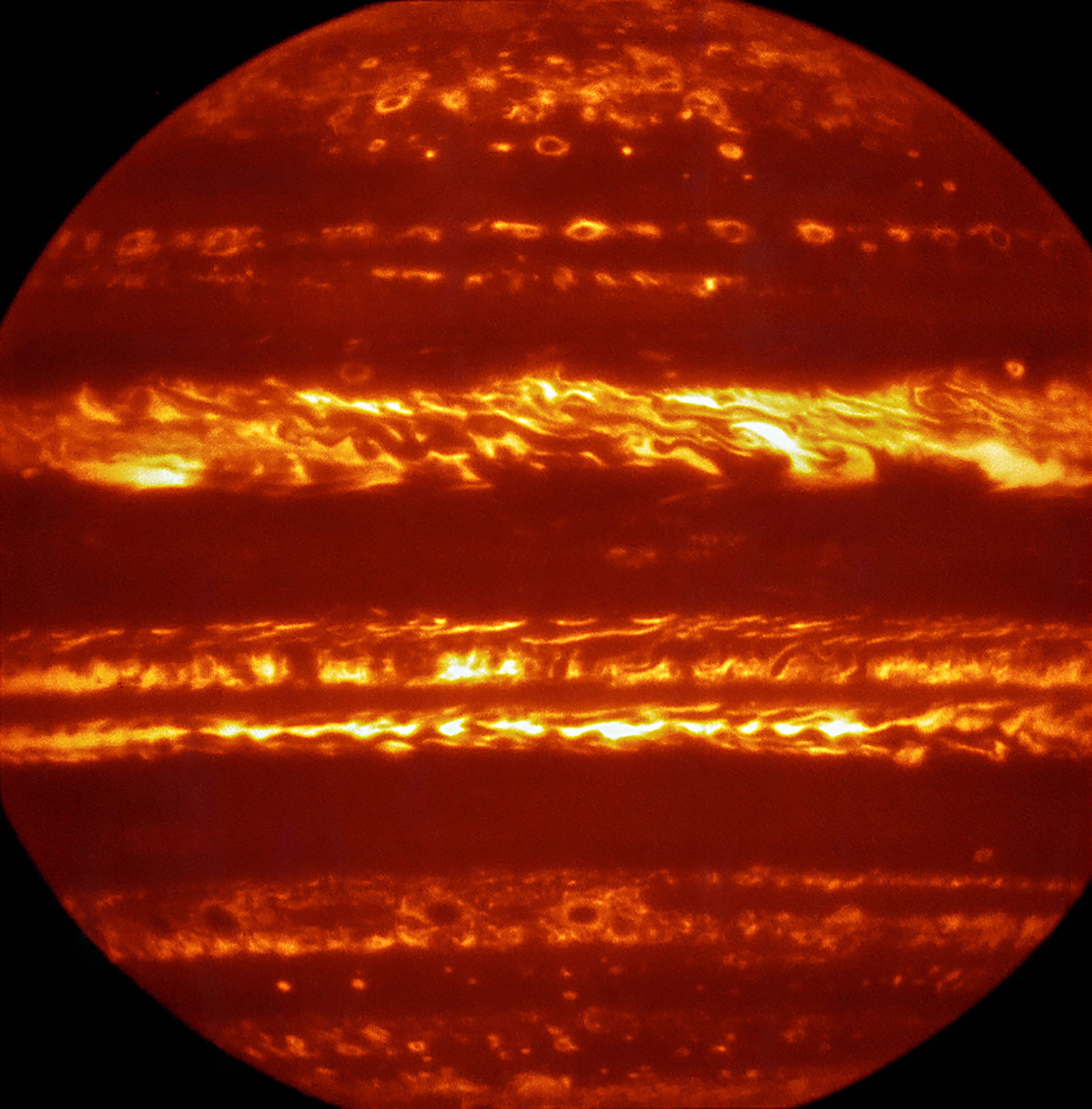
Jupiter imaged using the VISIR instrument on the Very Large Telescope, 2016. These observations helped to plan Juno's mission.

The Juno spacecraft's suite of science instruments will:

- Determine the ratio of oxygen to hydrogen, effectively measuring the abundance of water in Jupiter, which will help distinguish among prevailing theories linking Jupiter's formation to the Solar System.
- Obtain a better estimate of Jupiter's core mass, which will also help distinguish among prevailing theories linking Jupiter's formation to the Solar System.
- Precisely map Jupiter's gravitational field to assess the distribution of mass in Jupiter's interior, including properties of its structure and dynamics.
- Precisely map Jupiter's magnetic field to assess the origin and structure of the field, and the depth at which the planet's magnetic field is created. This experiment will also help scientists understand the fundamental physics of dynamo theory.
- Map the variation in atmospheric composition, temperature, structure, cloud opacity and dynamics to pressures far greater than 100 bar (10 MPa; 1,500 psi) at all latitudes.
- Characterize and explore the three-dimensional structure of Jupiter's polar magnetosphere and auroras.
- Measure the orbital frame-dragging, known also as Lense–Thirring precession caused by the angular momentum of Jupiter, and possibly a new test of general relativity effects connected with the Jovian rotation.

== Scientific instruments ==
The Juno mission's scientific objectives are being achieved with a payload of nine instruments on board the spacecraft:

=== Microwave radiometer (MWR) ===
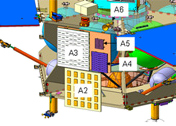
Microwave Radiometer

The microwave radiometer comprises six antennas mounted on two of the sides of the body of the probe. They will perform measurements of electromagnetic waves on frequencies in the microwave range: 600 MHz, 1.2, 2.4, 4.8, 9.6 and 22 GHz, the only microwave frequencies which are able to pass through the thick Jovian atmosphere. The radiometer will measure the abundance of water and ammonia in the deep layers of the atmosphere up to 200 bar (20 MPa; 2,900 psi) pressure or 500–600 km (310–370 mi) deep. The combination of different wavelengths and the emission angle should make it possible to obtain a temperature profile at various levels of the atmosphere. The data collected will determine how deep the atmospheric circulation is. The MWR is designed to function through orbit 11 of Jupiter.
(Principal investigator: Mike Janssen, Jet Propulsion Laboratory)

=== Jovian Infrared Auroral Mapper (JIRAM) ===
Jovian Infrared Auroral Mapper

The spectrometer mapper JIRAM, operating in the near infrared (between 2 and 5 μm), conducts surveys in the upper layers of the atmosphere to a depth of between 50 and 70 km (31 and 43 mi) where the pressure reaches 5 to 7 bar (500 to 700 kPa). JIRAM will provide images of the aurora in the wavelength of 3.4 μm in regions with abundant H_{3}^{+} ions. By measuring the heat radiated by the atmosphere of Jupiter, JIRAM can determine how clouds with water are flowing beneath the surface. It can also detect methane, water vapor, ammonia and phosphine. It was not required that this device meets the radiation resistance requirements. The JIRAM instrument is expected to operate through the eighth orbit of Jupiter.
(Principal investigator: Alberto Adriani, Italian National Institute for Astrophysics)

JIRAM's spin-compensation mirror is stuck since PJ44, but the instrument is operational.

=== Magnetometer (MAG) ===
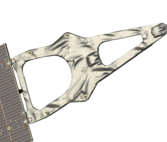
MAG

The magnetic field investigation has three goals: mapping of the magnetic field, determining the dynamics of Jupiter's interior, and determination of the three-dimensional structure of the polar magnetosphere. The magnetometer experiment consists of the Flux Gate Magnetometer (FGM), which will observe the strength and direction of the magnetic field lines, and the Advanced Stellar Compass (ASC), which will monitor the orientation of the magnetometer sensors.
(Principal investigator: Jack Connerney, NASA's Goddard Space Flight Center)

=== Gravity Science (GS) ===
Gravity Science

The purpose of measuring gravity by radio waves is to establish a map of the distribution of mass inside Jupiter. The uneven distribution of mass in Jupiter induces small variations in gravity all along the orbit followed by the probe when it runs closer to the surface of the planet. These gravity variations drive small probe velocity changes. The purpose of radio science is to detect the Doppler effect on radio broadcasts issued by Juno toward Earth in Ka-band and X-band, which are frequency ranges that can conduct the study with fewer disruptions related to the solar wind or Jupiter's ionosphere.
(Principal investigator: John Anderson, Jet Propulsion Laboratory; Principal investigator (Juno's Ka-band Translator): Luciano Iess, Sapienza University of Rome)

=== Jovian Auroral Distributions Experiment (JADE) ===
JADE

The energetic particle detector JADE will measure the angular distribution, energy, and the velocity vector of ions and electrons at low energy (ions between 13 eV and 20 KeV, electrons of 200 eV to 40 KeV) present in the aurora of Jupiter. On JADE, like JEDI, the electron analyzers are installed on three sides of the upper plate which allows a measure of frequency three times higher.
(Principal investigator: David McComas, Southwest Research Institute)

=== Jovian Energetic Particle Detector Instrument (JEDI) ===
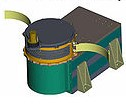
JEDI

The energetic particle detector JEDI will measure the angular distribution and the velocity vector of ions and electrons at high energy (ions between 20 keV and 1 MeV, electrons from 40 to 500 keV) present in the polar magnetosphere of Jupiter. JEDI has three identical sensors dedicated to the study of particular ions of hydrogen, helium, oxygen and sulfur.
(Principal investigator: Barry Mauk, Applied Physics Laboratory)

=== Radio and Plasma Wave Sensor (Waves) ===
Radio and Plasma Wave Sensor

This instrument will identify the regions of auroral currents that define Jovian radio emissions and acceleration of the auroral particles by measuring the radio and plasma spectra in the auroral region. It will also observe the interactions between Jupiter's atmosphere and magnetosphere. The instrument consists of two antennae that detect radio and plasma waves.
(Principal investigator: William Kurth, University of Iowa)

=== Ultraviolet Spectrograph (UVS) ===
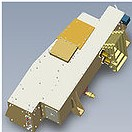
Ultraviolet Spectrograph

UVS will record the wavelength, position and arrival time of detected ultraviolet photons during the time when the spectrograph slit views Jupiter during each turn of the spacecraft. The instrument will provide spectral images of the UV auroral emissions in the polar magnetosphere.
(Principal investigator: G. Randall Gladstone, Southwest Research Institute)

=== JunoCam (JCM) ===
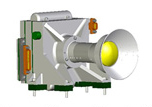
JunoCam

A visible light camera/telescope, included in the payload to facilitate education and public outreach; later re-purposed to study the dynamics of Jupiter's clouds, particularly those at the poles. It was anticipated that it would operate through only eight orbits of Jupiter ending in September 2017 due to the planet's damaging radiation and magnetic field, during Juno's 47th orbit, the imager began showing hints of radiation damage. By orbit 56, nearly all the images were corrupted; the cause was identified as a damaged voltage regulator. By annealing the camera at a temperature of 25 °C (77 °F), the camera was brought back to operations. Junocam undergoes this operation periodically and as of July 2025 remains in operation.
(Principal investigator: Michael C. Malin, Malin Space Science Systems)

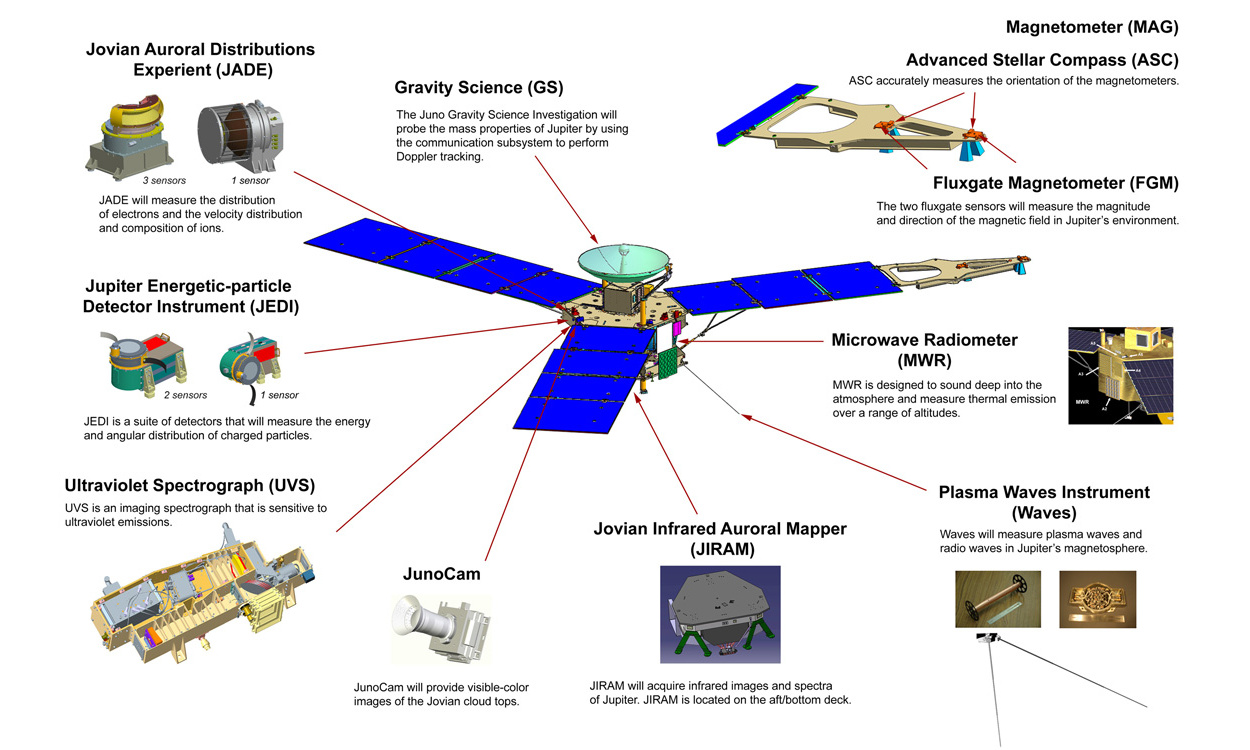
Locations of Juno's science instruments

Interactive 3D model of Juno

== Operational components ==
=== Satellite bus ===
Juno's satellite bus, its main electronics and propulsion box, is a hexagonal prism.

=== Solar panels ===
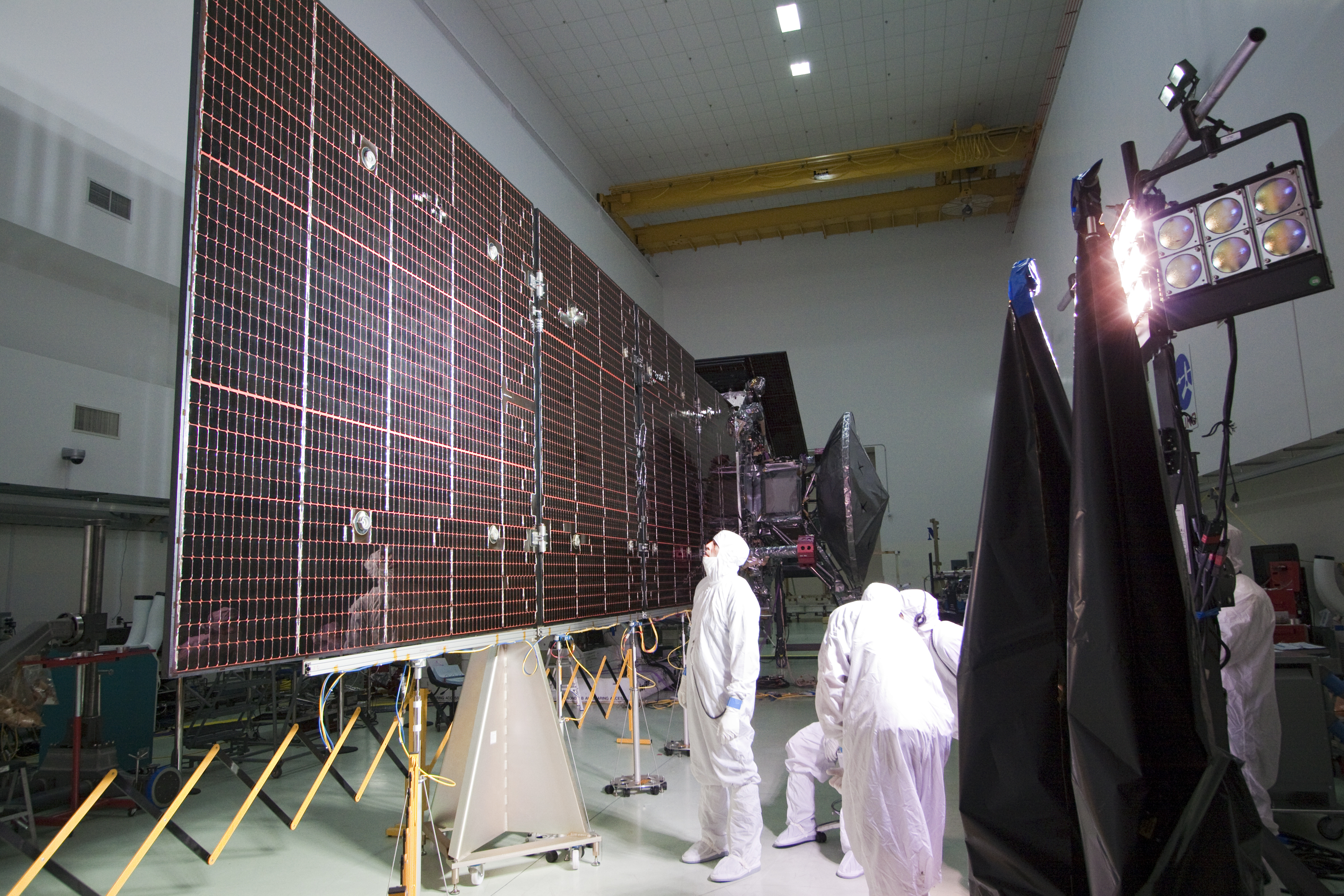
Illumination test on one of Juno's solar panels

Juno is the first mission to Jupiter and the Outer Solar System to use solar panels instead of the radioisotope thermoelectric generators (RTG) used by Pioneer 10, Pioneer 11, the Voyager program, Ulysses, Cassini–Huygens, New Horizons, and the Galileo orbiter. Once in orbit around Jupiter, Juno receives only 4% as much sunlight as it would on Earth, but the global shortage of plutonium-238 at the time, as well as advances made in solar cell technology over the past several decades, makes it economically preferable to use solar panels of practical size to provide power at a distance of 5 AU from the Sun.

The Juno spacecraft uses three solar panels symmetrically arranged around the spacecraft. Shortly after it cleared Earth's atmosphere, the panels were deployed. Two of the panels have four hinged segments each, and the third panel has three segments and a magnetometer. Each panel is 2.7 by 8.9 m (8 ft 10 in by 29 ft 2 in) providing 50 square metres (540 sq ft) of active cells – the largest on any NASA deep-space probe at the time of launching.

The combined mass of the three panels is nearly 340 kg (750 lb). If the panels were optimized to operate at Earth, they would produce 12 to 14 kilowatts of power. Only about 486 watts were generated when Juno arrived at Jupiter, projected to decline to near 420 watts as radiation degrades the cells. The solar panels will remain in sunlight continuously from launch through the end of the mission, except for short periods during the operation of the main engine and eclipses by Jupiter. A central power distribution and drive unit monitors the power that is generated by the solar panels and distributes it to instruments, heaters, and experiment sensors, as well as to batteries that are charged when excess power is available. Two 55 Ah lithium-ion batteries that are able to withstand the radiation environment of Jupiter provide power when Juno passes through eclipse.

=== Telecommunications ===
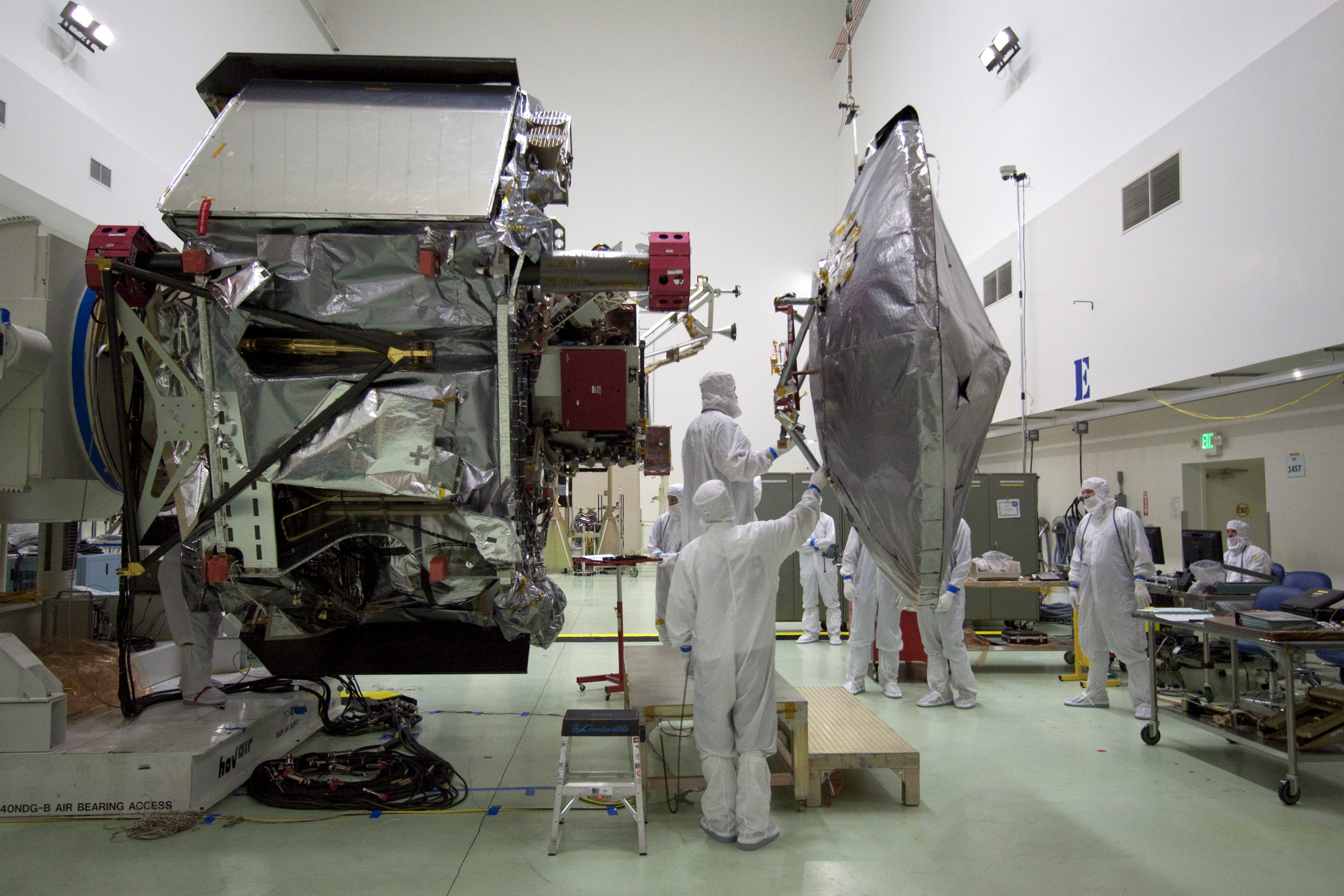
Juno's high-gain antenna dish being installed

Juno uses in-band signaling ("tones") for several critical operations as well as status reporting during cruise mode, but it is expected to be used infrequently. Communications are via the 34 m (112 ft) and 70 m (230 ft) antennas of the NASA Deep Space Network (DSN) utilizing an X-band direct link. The command and data processing of the Juno spacecraft includes a flight computer capable of providing about 50 Mbit/s of instrument throughput. Gravity science subsystems use the X-band and K_{a}-band Doppler tracking and autoranging.

Due to telecommunications constraints, Juno will only be able to return about 40 megabytes of JunoCam data during each 11-day orbital period, limiting the number of images that are captured and transmitted during each orbit to somewhere between 10 and 100 depending on the compression level used. The overall amount of data downlinked on each orbit is significantly higher and used for the mission's scientific instruments; JunoCam is intended for public outreach and is thus secondary to the science data. This is comparable to the previous Galileo mission that orbited Jupiter, which captured thousands of images despite its slow data rate of 1000 bit/s (at maximum compression level) due to the failure of its high gain antenna.

The communication system is also used as part of the Gravity Science experiment.

=== Propulsion ===
Juno uses a LEROS 1b main engine with hypergolic propellant, manufactured by Moog Inc in Westcott, Buckinghamshire, England. It uses approx. 2,000 kg (4,400 lb) of hydrazine and nitrogen tetroxide for propulsion, including 1,232 kg (2,716 lb) available for the Jupiter Orbit Insertion plus subsequent orbital maneuvers. The engine provides a thrust of 645 newtons. The engine bell is enclosed in a debris shield fixed to the spacecraft body, and is used for major burns. For control of the vehicle's orientation (attitude control) and to perform trajectory correction maneuvers, Juno utilizes a monopropellant reaction control system (RCS) consisting of twelve small thrusters that are mounted on four engine modules.

== Galileo plaque and minifigures ==
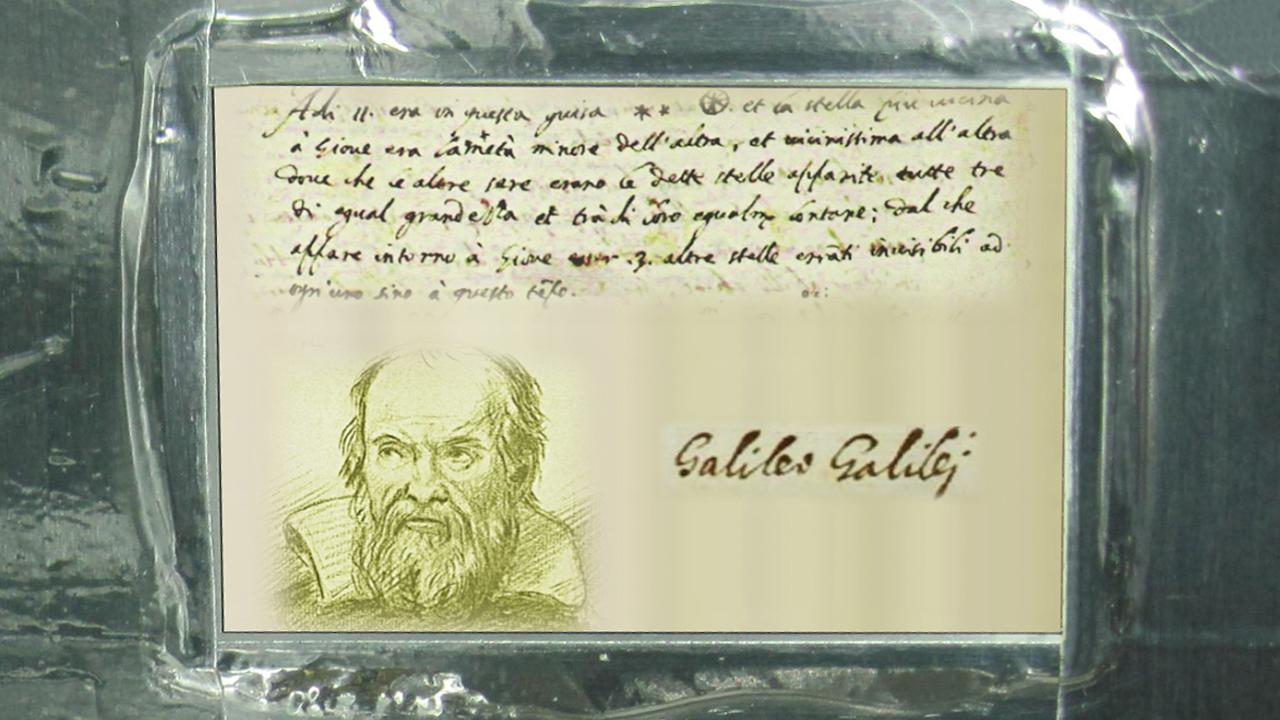
Galileo Galilei plaque

Juno carries a plaque to Jupiter, dedicated to Galileo Galilei. The plaque was provided by the Italian Space Agency (ASI) and measures 7.1 by 5.1 cm (2.8 by 2.0 in). It is made of flight-grade aluminum and weighs 6 g (0.21 oz). The plaque depicts a portrait of Galileo and a text in Galileo's own handwriting, penned in January 1610, while observing what would later be known to be the Galilean moons. The text translates as:

On the 11th it was in this formation – and the star closest to Jupiter was half the size than the other and very close to the other so that during the previous nights all of the three observed stars looked of the same dimension and among them equally afar; so that it is evident that around Jupiter there are three moving stars invisible till this time to everyone.

The spacecraft also carries three Lego minifigures representing Galileo Galilei, the Roman god Jupiter, and his sister and wife, the goddess Juno. In Roman mythology, Jupiter drew a veil of clouds around himself to hide his mischief. Juno was able to peer through the clouds and reveal Jupiter's true nature. The Juno minifigure holds a magnifying glass as a sign of searching for the truth, and Jupiter holds a lightning bolt. The third Lego crew member, Galileo Galilei, has his telescope with him on the journey. The figurines were produced in partnership between NASA and Lego as part of an outreach program to inspire children's interest in science, technology, engineering, and mathematics (STEM). Although most Lego toys are made of plastic, Lego specially made these minifigures of aluminum to endure the extreme conditions of space flight.

== Scientific results ==
Among early results, Juno gathered information about Jovian lightning that revised earlier theories. Juno provided the first views of Jupiter's north pole, as well as providing insight about Jupiter's aurorae, magnetic field, and atmosphere.

In 2021, analysis of the frequency of interplanetary dust impacts (primarily on the backs of the solar panels), as Juno passed between Earth and the asteroid belt, indicated that this dust, which causes the zodiacal light, comes from Mars, rather than from comets or asteroids that come from the outer solar system, as was previously thought.

Juno made many discoveries that are challenging existing theories about Jupiter's formation. When Juno flew over the poles of Jupiter it imaged clusters of stable cyclones that exist at the poles. It found that the magnetosphere of Jupiter is uneven and chaotic. Using its Microwave Radiometer, Juno found that the red and white bands that can be seen on Jupiter extend hundreds of kilometers into the Jovian atmosphere, yet the interior of Jupiter is not evenly mixed. This has resulted in the theory that Jupiter does not have a solid core as previously thought, but a "fuzzy" core made of pieces of rock and metallic hydrogen. This peculiar core may be a result of a collision that happened early in Jupiter's formation.

In April 2020, Juno detected a meteor impact on Jupiter, with estimated mass of 250–5000 kg.

Results from Juno on storms suggests that they are far taller than expected, with some extending 60 miles (100 kilometers) below the cloud tops and others, including the Great Red Spot, extending over 200 miles (350 kilometers). With Juno traveling low over Jupiter's cloud deck at about 130,000 mph (209,000 kph) Juno scientists were able to measure velocity changes as small as 0.01 millimeter per second using a NASA's Deep Space Network tracking antenna, from a distance of more than 400 million miles (650 million kilometers). This enabled the team to constrain the depth of the Great Red Spot to about 300 miles (500 kilometers) below the cloud tops. The new results show that the cyclones are warmer on top, with lower atmospheric densities, while they are colder at the bottom, with higher densities. Anticyclones, which rotate in the opposite direction, are colder at the top but warmer at the bottom.

Juno observed the impact of a severe solar flare on the Jovian system in October 2024. This X1.8 class flare shrank the magnetosphere from ~80 Jupiter radii to inwards of 30 Jupiter radii, the most significant compression ever observed at the planet. The same solar flare impacted Earth earlier in the month, causing aurorae to be visible as far south as Arizona in the United States and as far north as Queensland in Australia.

== Timeline ==
Date (UTC)	Event	Latitude (centric)	Longitude (Sys. III)
August 5, 2011, 16:25:00	Launched		
August 5, 2012, 06:57:00	Deep Space Maneuvers (total dV: 345 m/s + 385 m/s)		
September 3, 2012, 06:30:00	Deep Space Maneuvers (total dV: 345 m/s + 385 m/s)		
October 9, 2013, 19:21:00	Earth gravity assist (from 126,000 to 150,000 km/h (78,000 to 93,000 mph)) — Gallery		
July 5, 2016, 03:53:00	Arrival at Jupiter and polar orbit insertion (1st orbit).	3°	30°
August 27, 2016, 12:50:44	Perijove 1 — Gallery	4°	100°
October 19, 2016, 18:10:53	Perijove 2: Planned Period Reduction Maneuver, but the main engine's fuel pressurization system did not operate as expected.	5°	350°
December 11, 2016, 17:03:40	Perijove 3	6°	10°
February 2, 2017, 12:57:09	Perijove 4	7°	270°
March 27, 2017, 08:51:51	Perijove 5	8°	180°
May 19, 2017, 06:00:47	Perijove 6	8°	140°
July 11, 2017, 01:54:42	Perijove 7: Flyover of the Great Red Spot	9°	50°
September 1, 2017, 21:48:50	Perijove 8	10°	320°
October 24, 2017, 17:42:31	Perijove 9	11°	230°
December 16, 2017, 17:56:59	Perijove 10	12°	300°
February 7, 2018, 13:51:49	Perijove 11	13°	210°
April 1, 2018, 09:45:57	Perijove 12	14°	110°
May 24, 2018, 05:40:07	Perijove 13	15°	20°
July 16, 2018, 05:17:38	Perijove 14: End of primary mission.	16°	70°
September 7, 2018, 01:11:55	Perijove 15	17°	340°
October 29, 2018, 21:06:15	Perijove 16	17°	250°
December 21, 2018, 17:00:25	Perijove 17	18°	160°
February 12, 2019, 16:19:48	Perijove 18	19°	240°
April 6, 2019, 12:13:58	Perijove 19	20°	100°
May 29, 2019, 08:08:13	Perijove 20	20°	10°
July 21, 2019, 04:02:44	Perijove 21	21°	280°
September 12, 2019, 03:40:47	Perijove 22	22°	320°
November 3, 2019, 23:32:56	Perijove 23	22°	190°
December 26, 2019, 16:58:59	Perijove 24: Distant Ganymede flyby	23°	70°
February 17, 2020, 17:51:36	Perijove 25	23°	140°
April 10, 2020, 14:24:34	Perijove 26	24°	50°
June 2, 2020, 10:19:55	Perijove 27	25°	340°
July 25, 2020, 06:15:21	Perijove 28	25°	250°
September 16, 2020, 02:10:49	Perijove 29	26°	160°
November 8, 2020, 01:49:39	Perijove 30	27°	210°
December 30, 2020, 21:45:12	Perijove 31	27°	120°
February 21, 2021, 17:40:31	Perijove 32	28°	30°
April 15, 2021, 13:36:26	Perijove 33	29°	300°
June 8, 2021, 07:46:00	Perijove 34: Ganymede flyby, coming within 1,038 km (645 mi) of the moon's surface. Orbital period reduced from 53 days to 43 days.	28°	290°
July 21, 2021, 08:15:05	Perijove 35: End of first mission extension. Originally scheduled for July 30, 2021, prior to approval of second mission extension.	29°	300°
September 2, 2021 22:42:51	Perijove 36	30°	100°
October 16, 2021 17:13:32	Perijove 37	31°	40°
November 29, 2021 14:13:29	Perijove 38	31°	80°
January 12, 2022 10:33:01	Perijove 39	32°	90°
February 25, 2022 01:59:56	Perijove 40	33°	280°
April 9, 2022 15:49:17	Perijove 41	34°	60°
May 23, 2022 02:15:53	Perijove 42	35°	70°
July 5, 2022 09:17:22	Perijove 43	36°	310°
August 17, 2022 14:45:39	Perijove 44	37°	150°
September 29, 2022, 09:36	Perijove 45: Europa flyby. Closest approach: 352 km (219 mi). Orbital period reduced from 43 days to 38 days.	37°	230°
November 6, 2022, 21:38:36	Perijove 46	38°	350°
December 15, 2022, 03:23:22	Perijove 47: Io flyby on Dec 14, 2022. Closest approach: 64,000 km (40,000 mi).	39°	160°
January 22, 2023, 05:44:18	Perijove 48	40°	200°
March 1, 2023, 05:53:21	Perijove 49	41°	170°
April 8, 2023, 08:13:34	Perijove 50	42°	210°
May 16, 2023, 7:22:44	Perijove 51	43°	140°
June 23, 2023, 06:55:08	Perijove 52	44°	80°
July 31, 2023, 09:05:43	Perijove 53: Io flyby on July 30, 2023. Closest approach: 22,000 km (14,000 mi).	45°	120°
September 7, 2023, 11:58:01	Perijove 54	45°	190°
October 15, 2023, 10:52:49	Perijove 55	46°	110°
November 22, 2023, 12:17:18	Perijove 56	47°	120°
December 30, 2023, 12:36:20	Perijove 57: Io flyby. Closest approach: 1,500 km (930 mi).	47°	90°
February 3, 2024, 21:47:29	Perijove 58: Io flyby. Closest approach: 1,500 km (930 mi). Orbital period reduced from 38 to 33 days.	48°	290°
March 7, 2024, 15:42:20	Perijove 59: Distant Amalthea flyby. Closest approach: 117,500 km (73,000 mi)	49°	360°
April 9, 2024, 08:48:18	Perijove 60	50°	30°
May 12, 2024, 03:38:38	Perijove 61	51°	130°
June 13, 2024, 19:53:40	Perijove 62	52°	140°
July 16, 2024, 14:33:58	Perijove 63	53°	230°
August 18, 2024, 06:57:08	Perijove 64	54°	240°
September 20, 2024, 02:28:52	Perijove 65	55°	10°
October 22, 2024, 18:11:01	Perijove 66	56°	350°
November 24, 2024, 13:05:27	Perijove 67	57°	100°
December 27, 2024, 05:22:29	Perijove 68	57°	100°
January 28, 2025, 23:05:12	Perijove 69	58°	160°
March 2, 2025, 16:04:32	Perijove 70: Thebe flyby, closest approach: 31,780 km (19,750 mi)	59°	200°
April 4, 2025, 09:30:54	Perijove 71: Juno experienced safe mode emergency shut down due to radiation damage.	60°	240°
May 7, 2025, 03:01:32	Perijove 72	61°	300°
June 8, 2025, 20:30:46	Perijove 73	62°	350°
July 11, 2025, 13:40:03	Perijove 74	63°	20°
August 13, 2025, 07:04:54	Perijove 75: No images were taken because JunoCam was undergoing repair through annealing after suffering radiation damages.	63°	70°
September 14, 2025, 23:52:04	Perijove 76: End of second mission extension. Io flyby.	64°	90°
October 17, 2025, 16:04:42	Perijove 77: Start of continuing operations past the second mission extension.		
November 19, 2025, 08:37:50	Perijove 78		
December 22, 2025, 01:14:17	Perijove 79		
January 23, 2026, 17:17:27	Perijove 80		
February 25, 2026, 09:32:58	Perijove 81		
March 29, 2026, 22:02:49	Perijove 82		
May 1, 2026, 15:01:51	Perijove 83: Thebe flyby at 5,000km.		
June 3, 2026, 06:52:33	Perijove 84: Adrastea flyby, closest approach 11,747 km.		
July 5, 2026, 22:02:49	Perijove 85		
August 7, 2026, 14:51:48	Perijove 86		
September 9, 2026, 06:25:37	Perijove 87		
October 11, 2026, 23:07:33	Perijove 88:		
November 13, 2026, 14:57:59	Perijove 89: Metis flyby, closest approach 11,340 km.		
December 16, 2026, 07:25:09	Perijove 90		
January 17, 2027, 23:32:08	Perijove 91		
February 19, 2027, 15:14:22	Perijove 92		
March 24, 2027, 06:52:14	Perijove 93		
April 25, 2027, 06:52:14	Perijove 94: Amalthea flyby, closest approach 13,720 km.		
May 28, 2027, 22:22:29	Perijove 95		
June 30, 2027, 06:19:19	Perijove 96		
August 1, 2027, 22:26:23	Perijove 97		
September 3, 2027, 14:17:58	Perijove 98		
October 6, 2027, 06:35:00	Perijove 99		
November 7, 2027, 22:51:34	Perijove 100: Thebe flyby, closest approach 21,155 km.		
December 10, 2027, 15:43:12	Perijove 101		
January 12, 2028, 08:19:35	Perijove 102		
February 14, 2028, 01:28:38	Perijove 103		
March 17, 2028, 18:17:23	Perijove 104		
April 19, 2028, 11:56:55	Perijove 105		
May 22, 2028, 04:56:57	Perijove 106		
June 23, 2028, 22:32:02	Perijove 107: Amalthea flyby, closest approach 18,495 km.		
July 26, 2028, 15:31:11	Perijove 108		
August 28, 2028, 09:11:48	Perijove 109		
September 30, 2028, 02:32:07	Perijove 110		

== Gallery ==
=== Jupiter ===
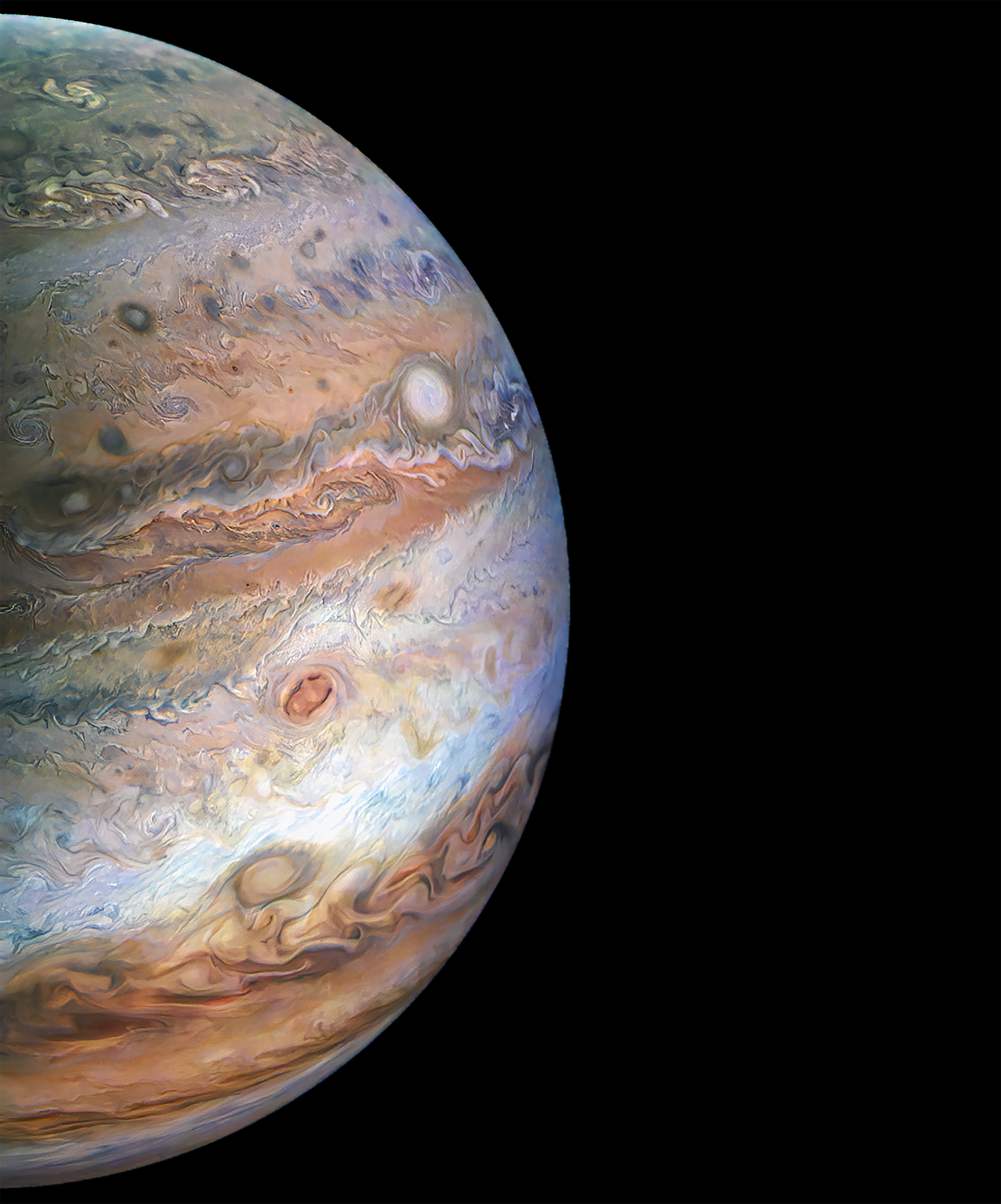
Perijove 26 image

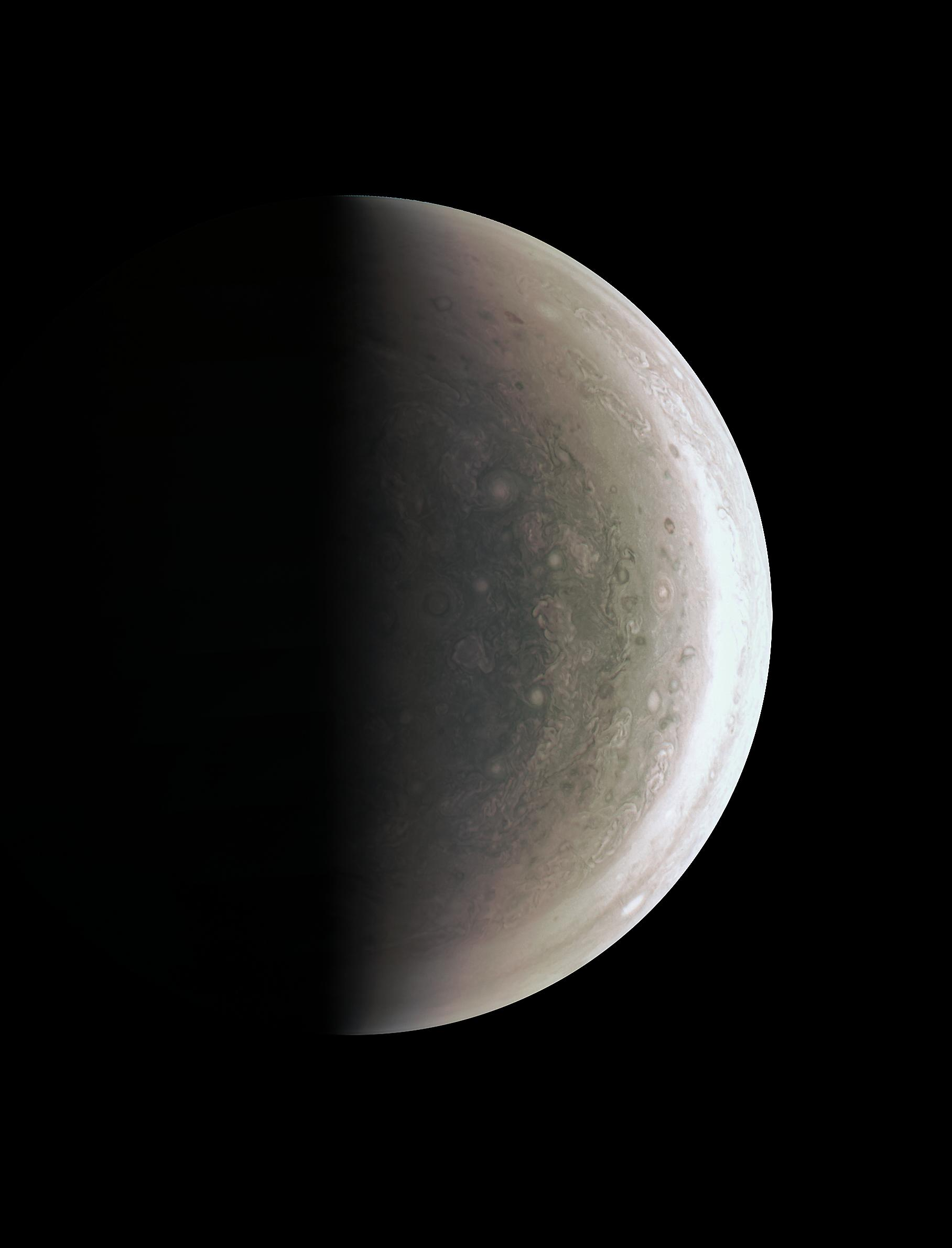
Image from about 94,500 km (58,700 mi) of Jupiter's southern polar region (27 August 2016)

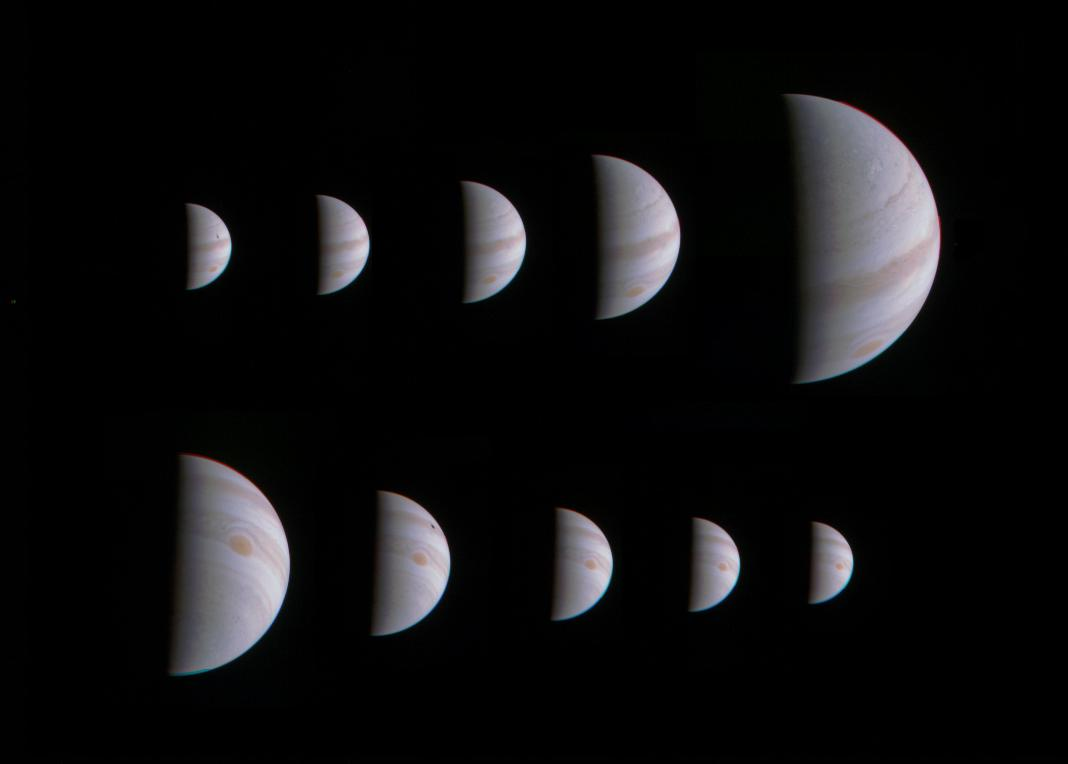
Jupiter growing and shrinking in apparent size before and after the spacecraft made its closest approach (27 August 2016)

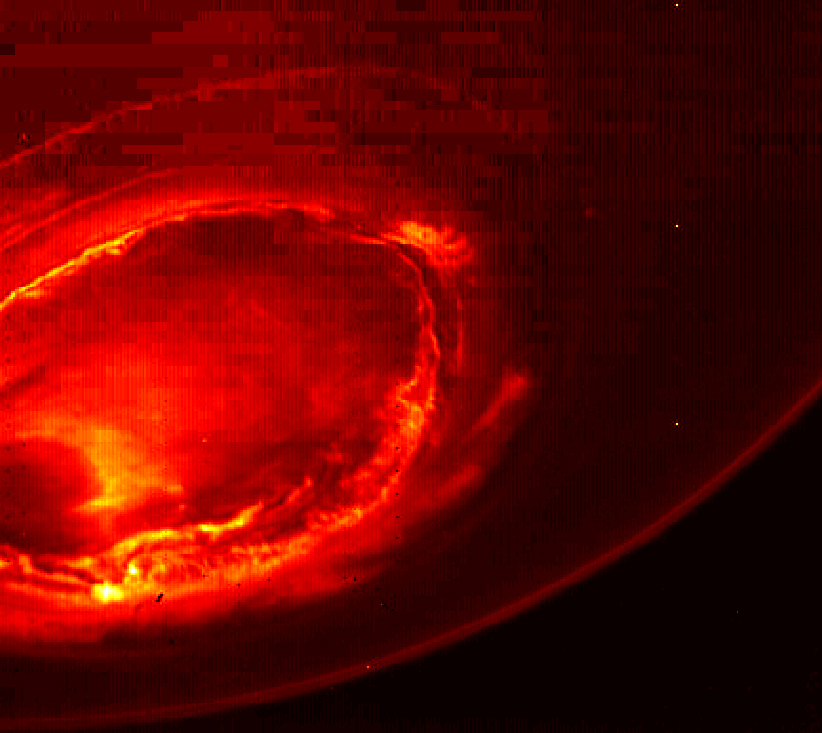
Infrared view of the southern aurora of Jupiter (27 August 2016)

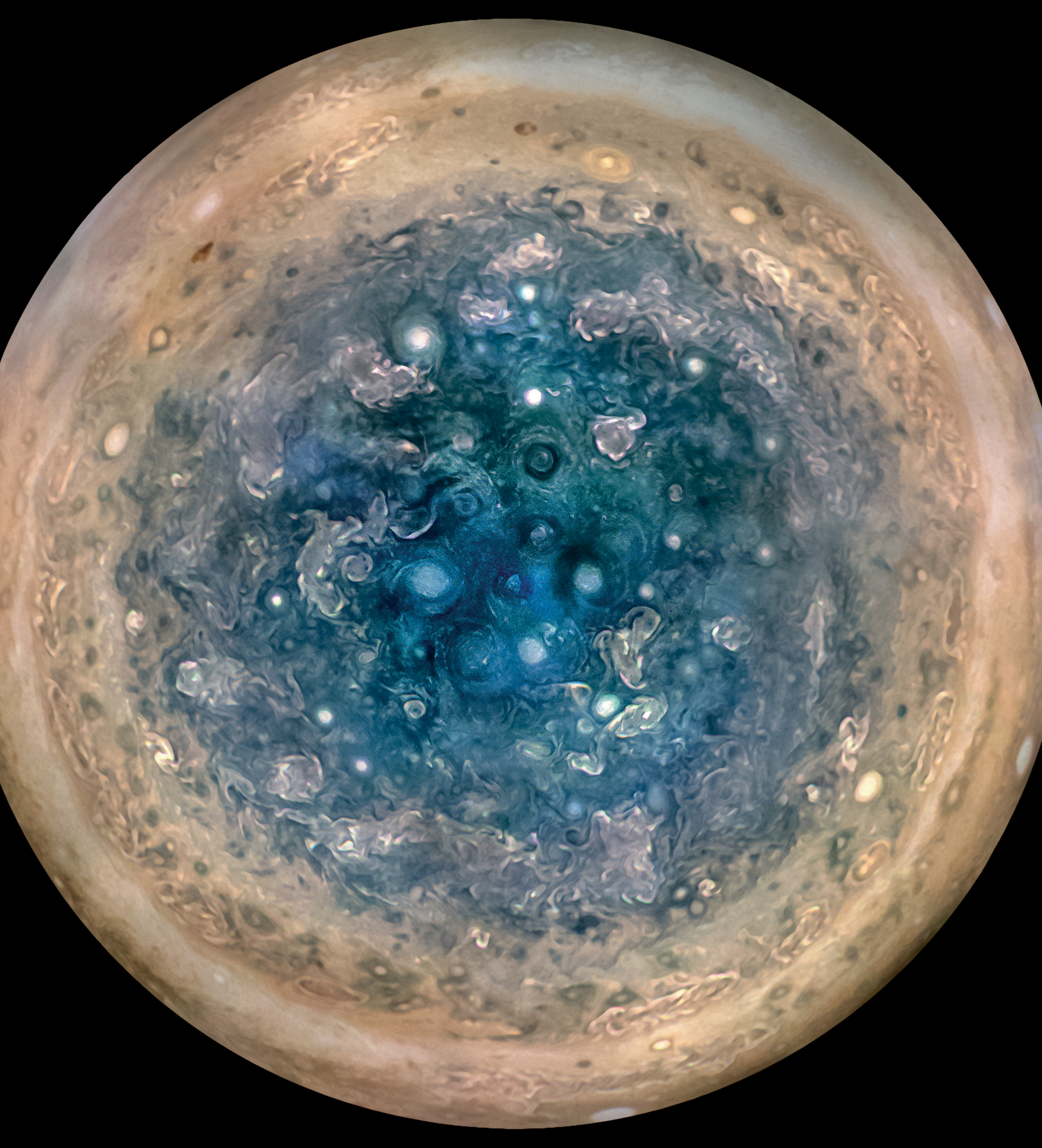
Southern storms of Jupiter

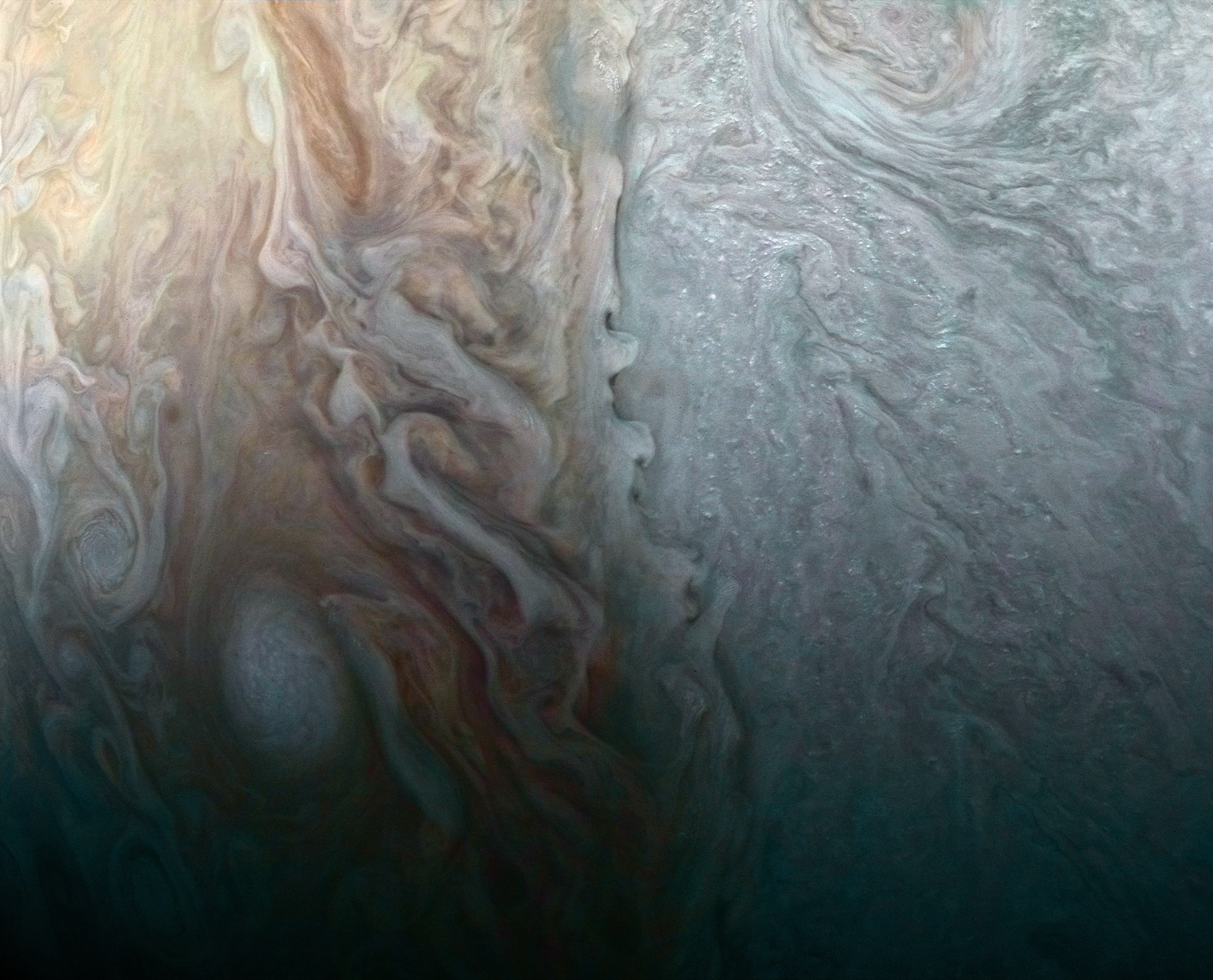
Area of Jupiter where multiple atmospheric conditions appear to collide (27 March 2017)

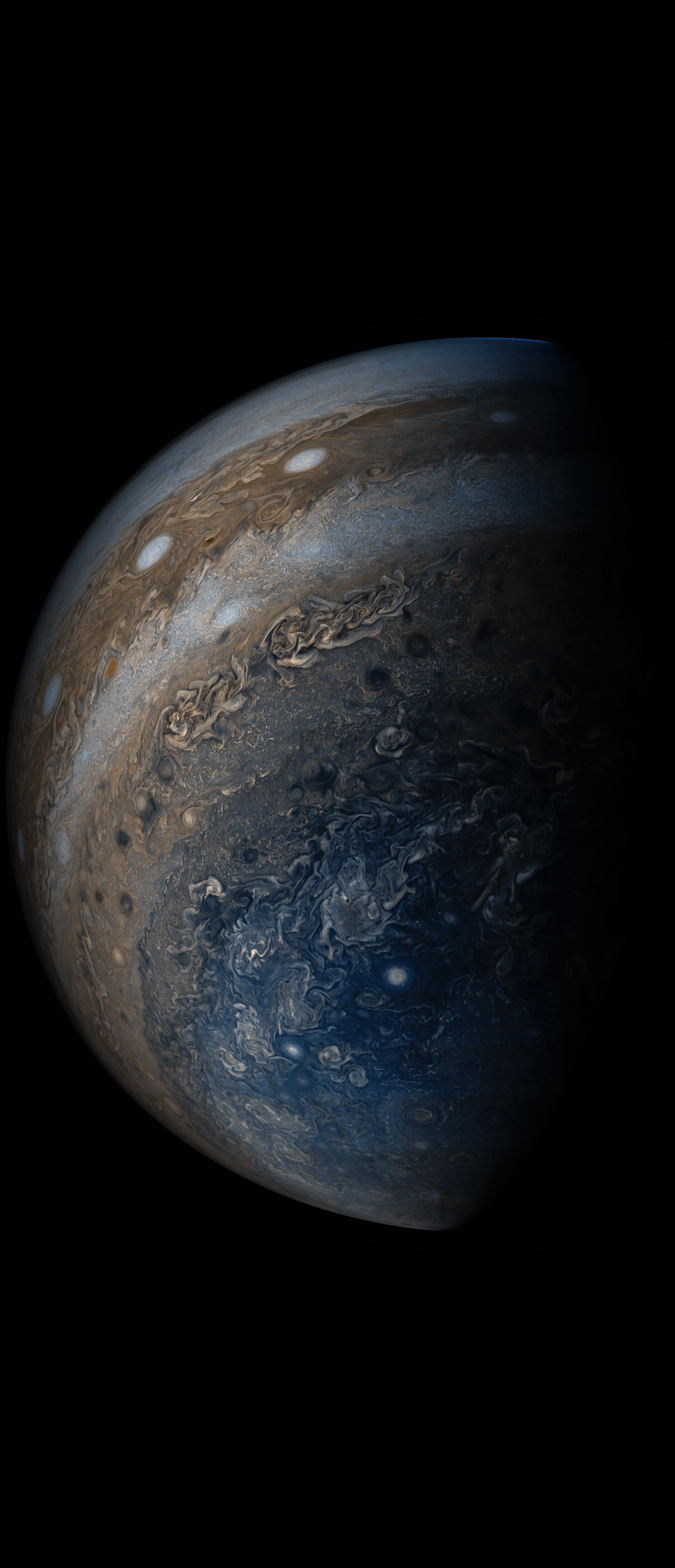
Retreating from Jupiter, about 46,900 km (29,100 mi) above the cloud tops (19 May 2017)

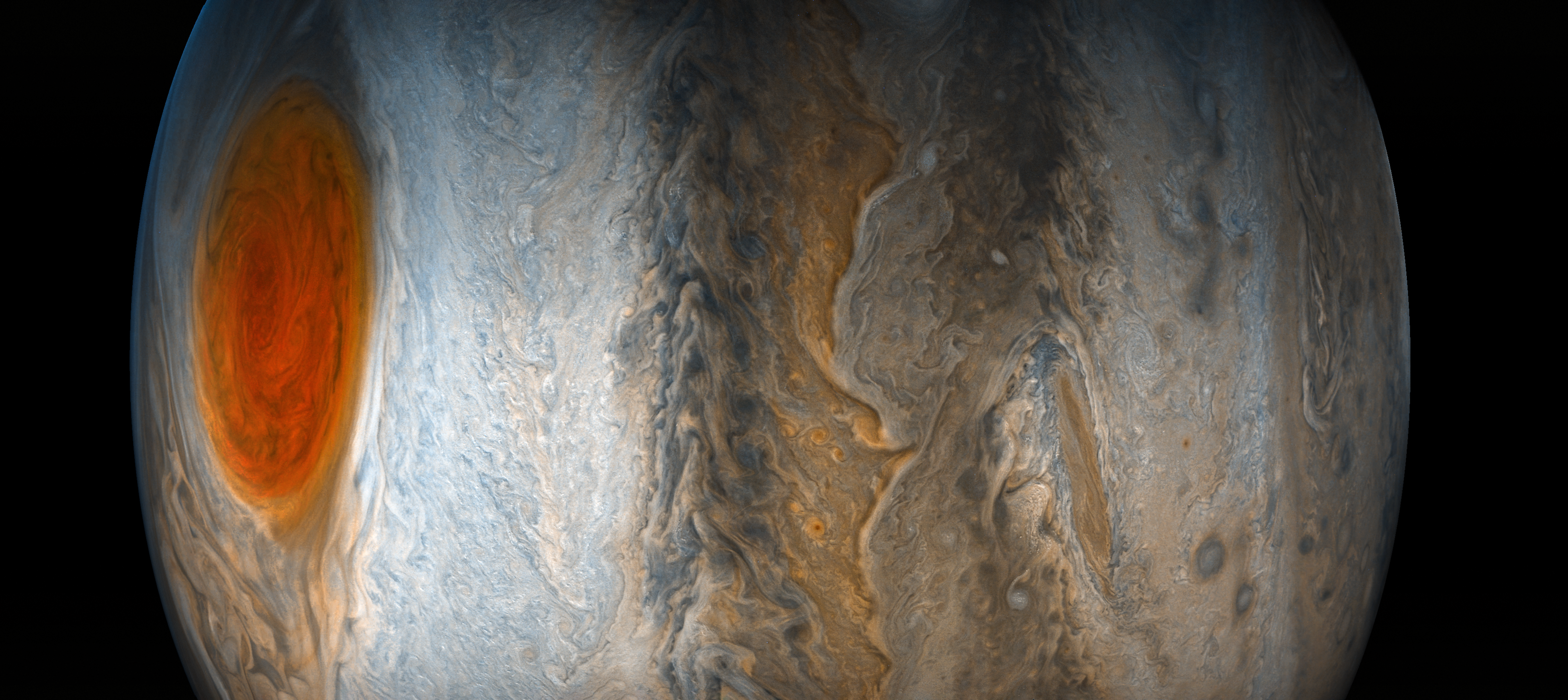
Image taken from 16,535 km (10,274 mi) above the atmosphere at a latitude of −36.9° (10 July 2017)

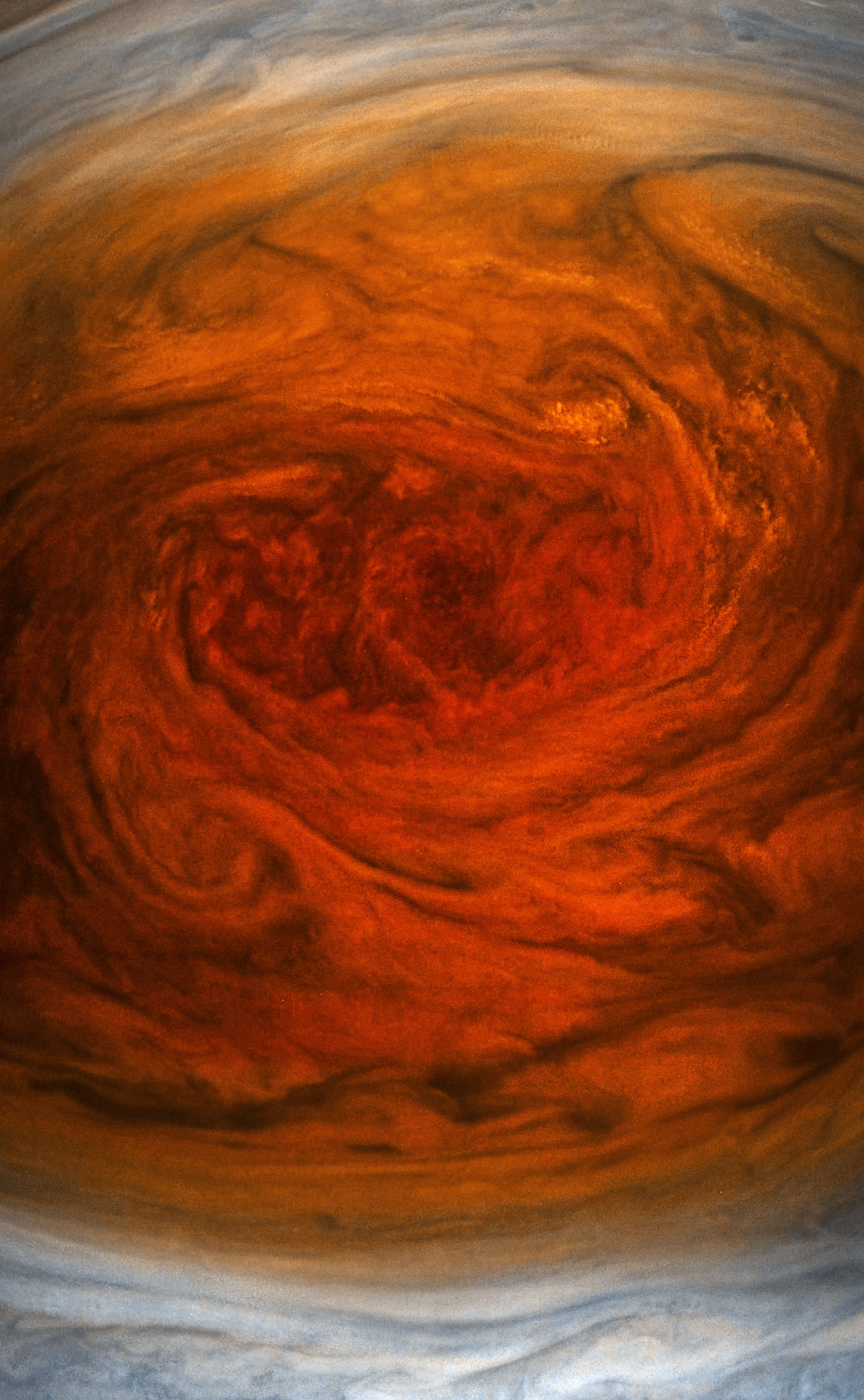
Closeup of the Great Red Spot taken from about 8,000 km (5,000 mi) above it (11 July 2017)

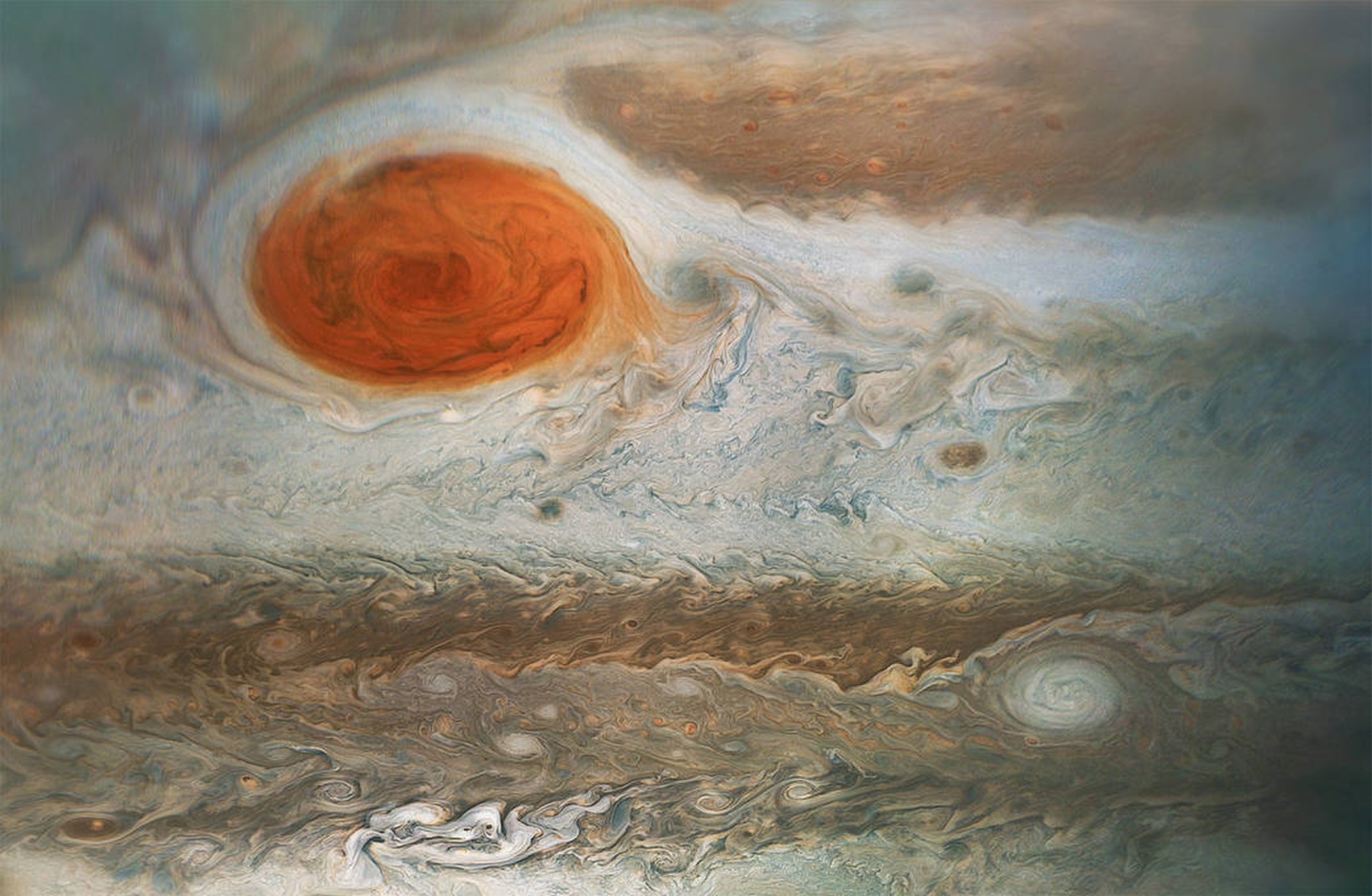
The Great Red Spot as seen by JunoCam in April 2018

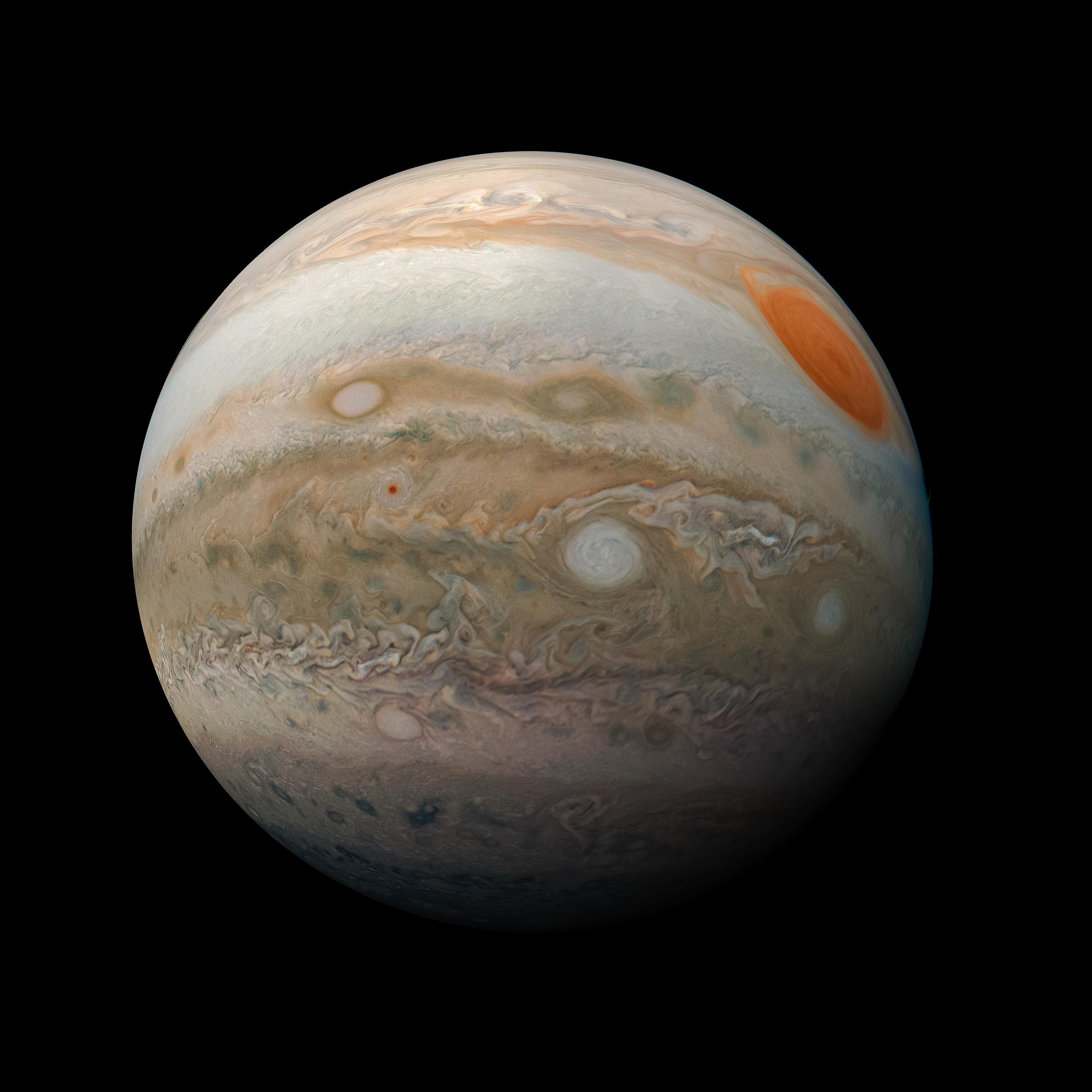
Jupiter viewed by Juno
(12 February 2019)

Jupiter flyover
(Juno; 05:07; 2 June 2020)

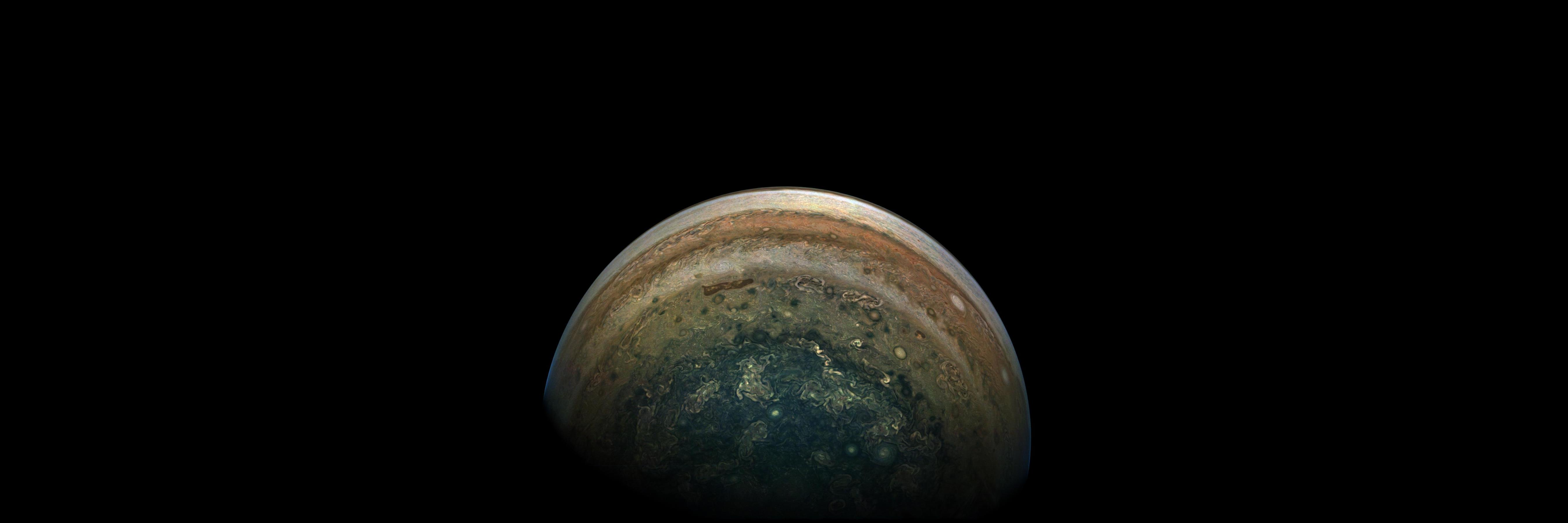
Photograph taken at the end of Perijove 15 (September 6, 2018)

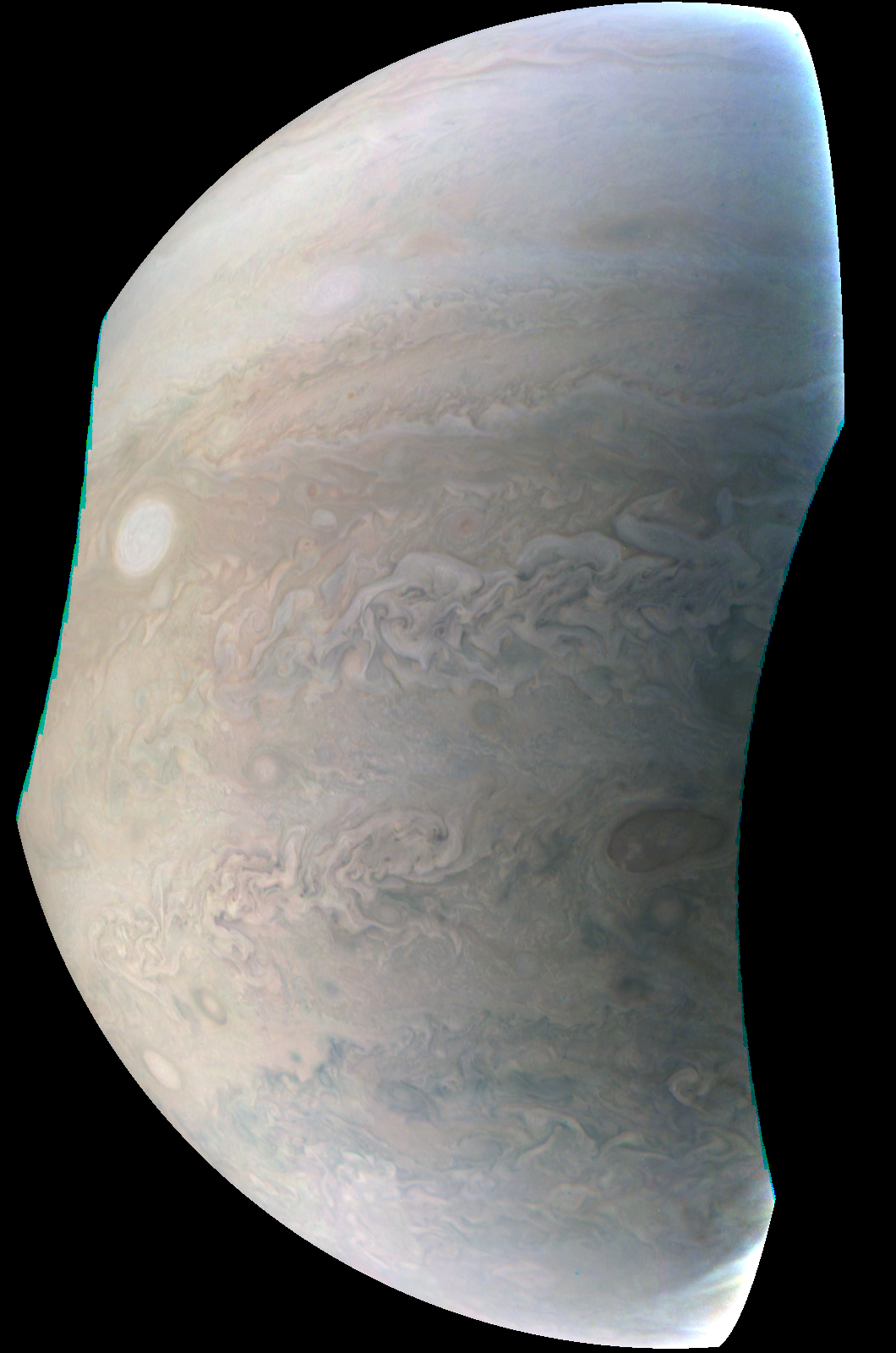
Juno view of Jovian southern hemisphere.

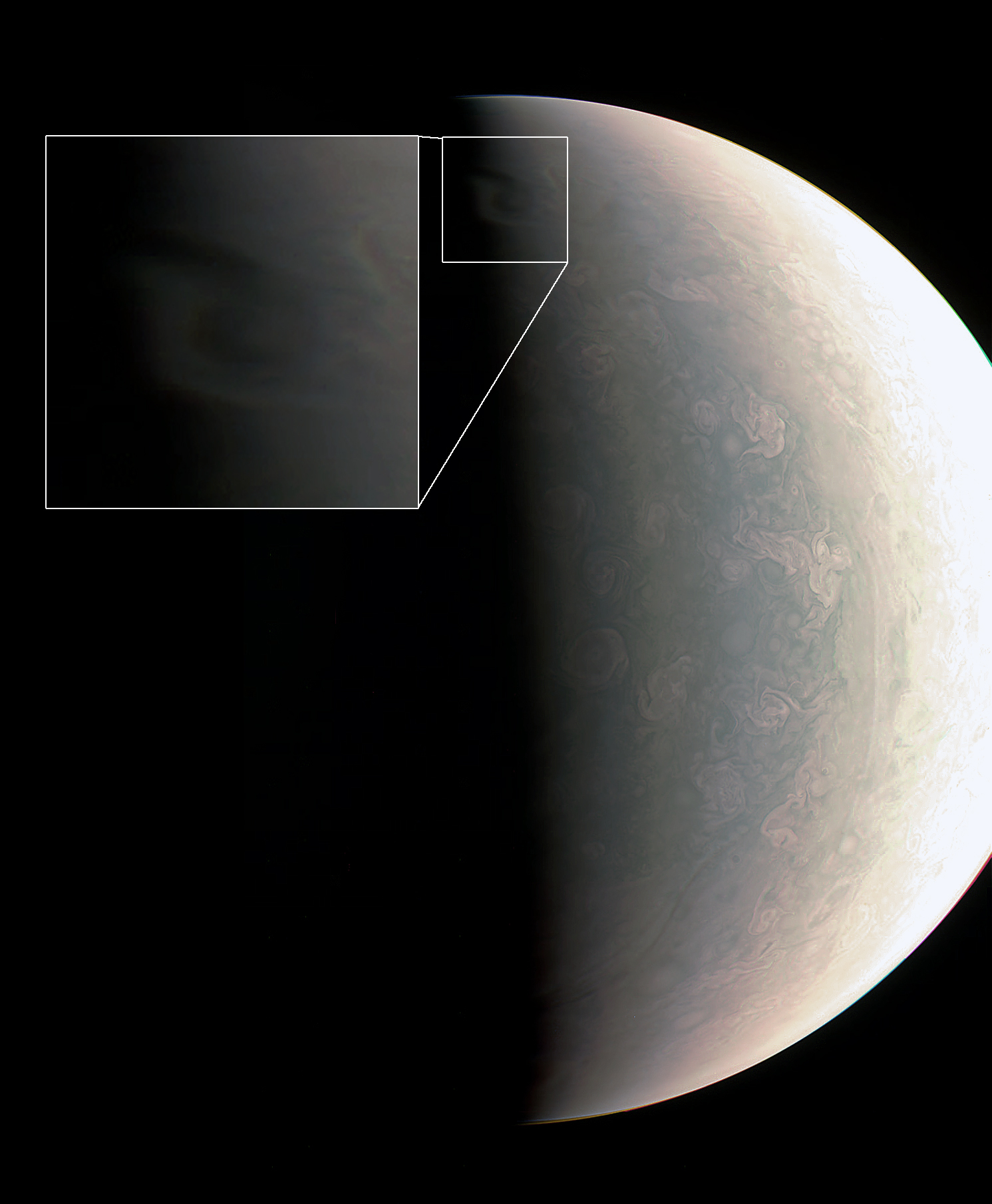
Jovian north pole by Juno.

=== Moons ===
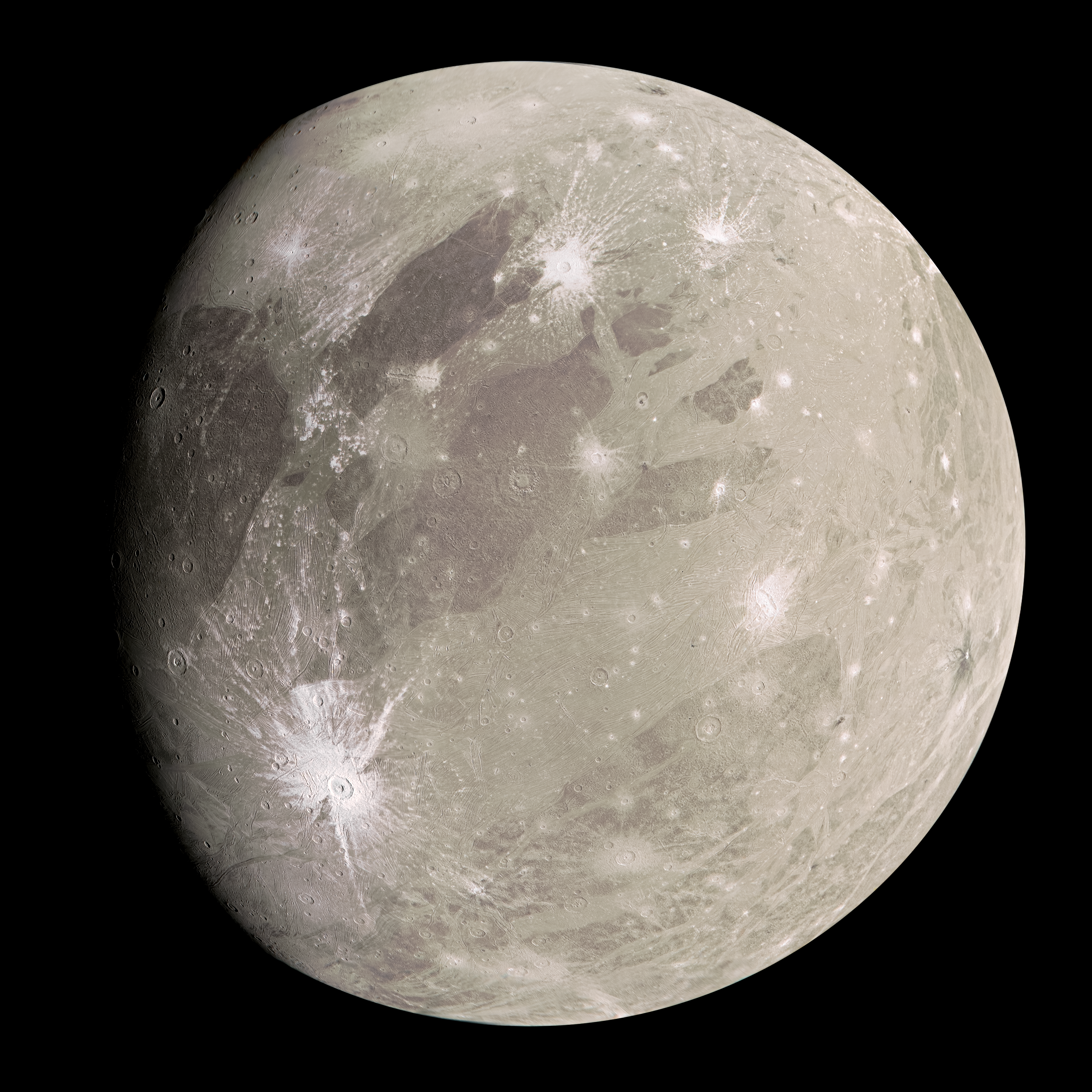
Ganymede, taken by the JunoCam instrument during Juno's flyby on 7 June 2021

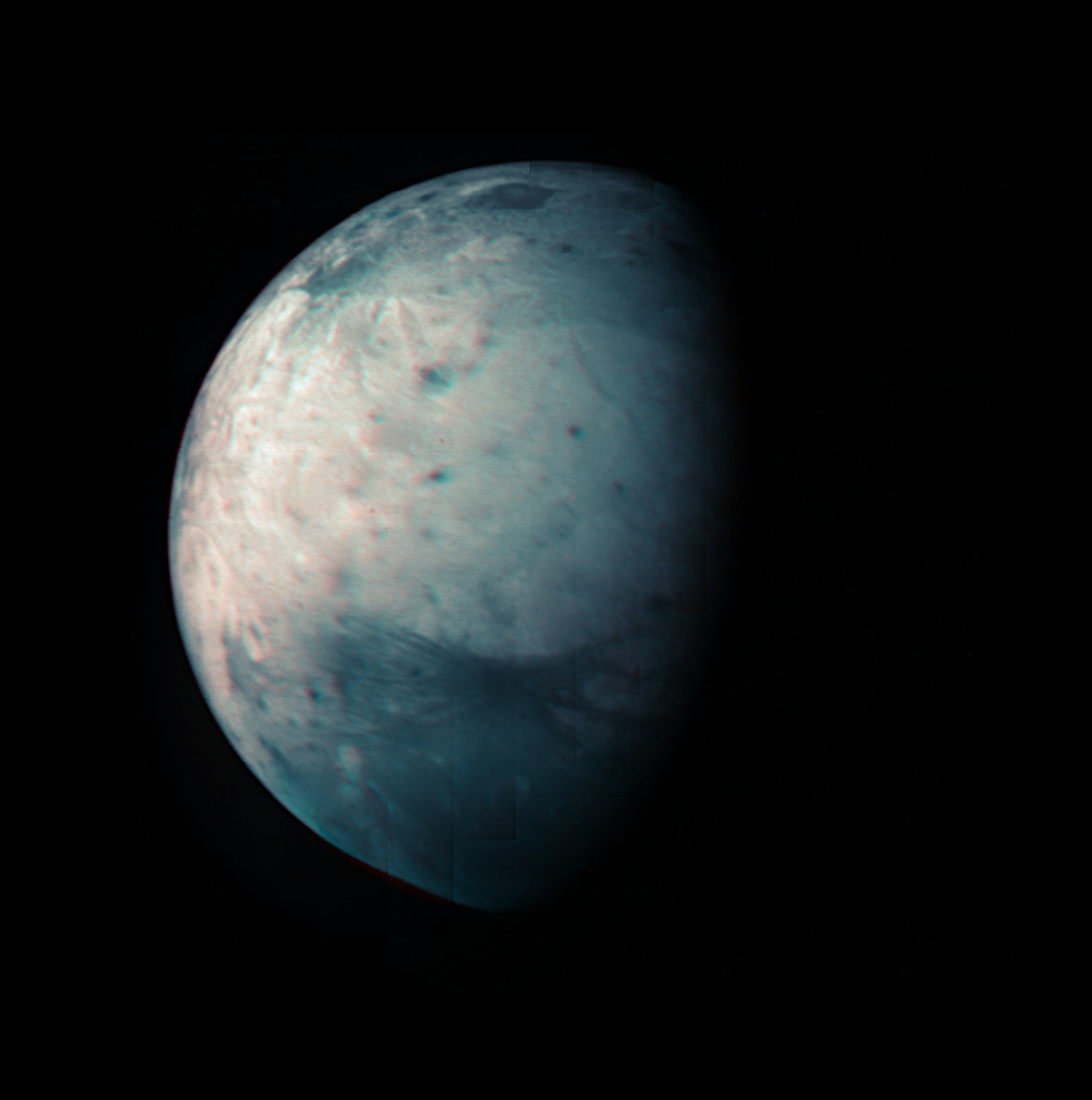
Infrared view of Ganymede during the anniversary flyby by Juno

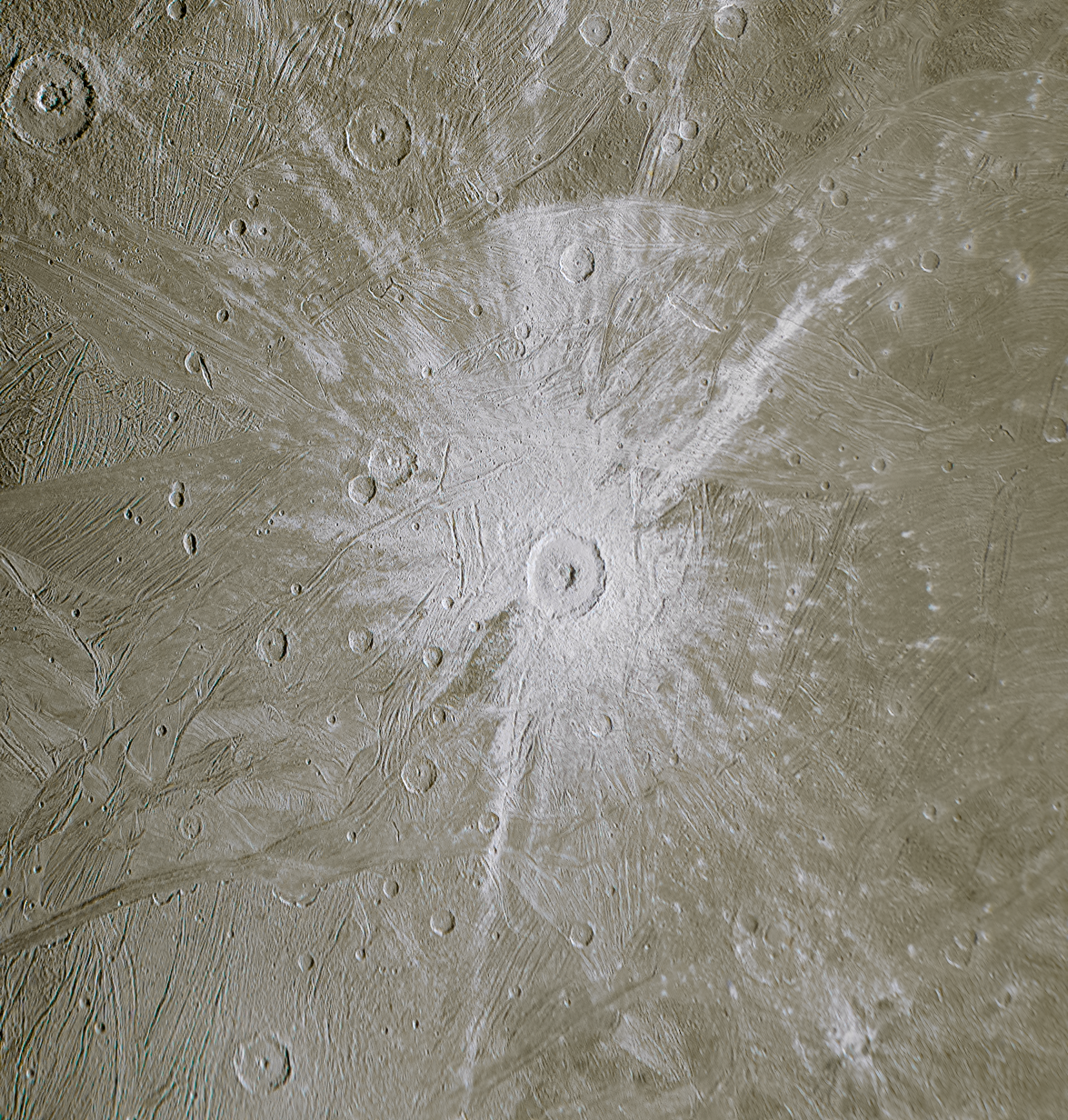
Tros Crater on Ganymede.

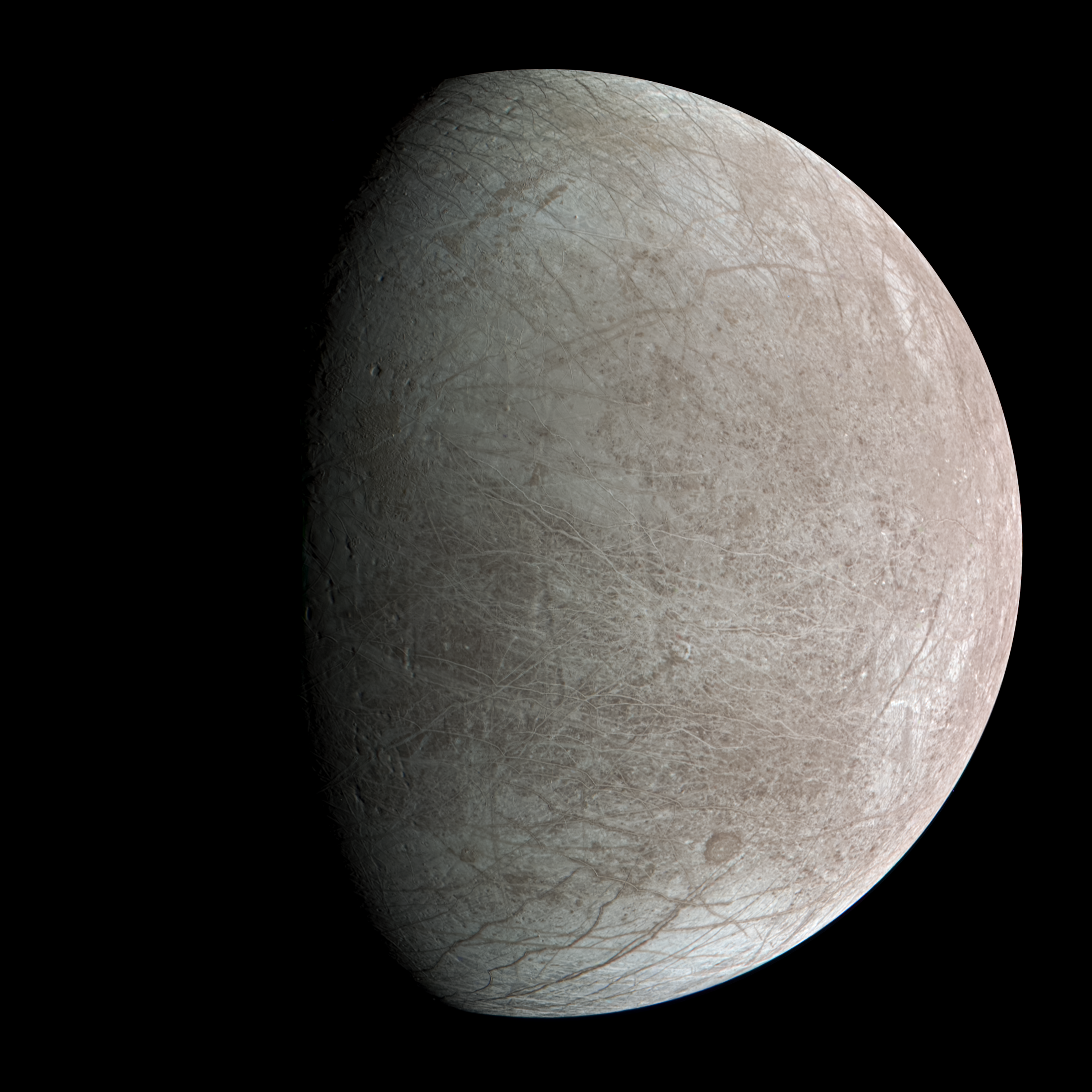
View of Europa taken during Juno's flyby on 29 September 2022

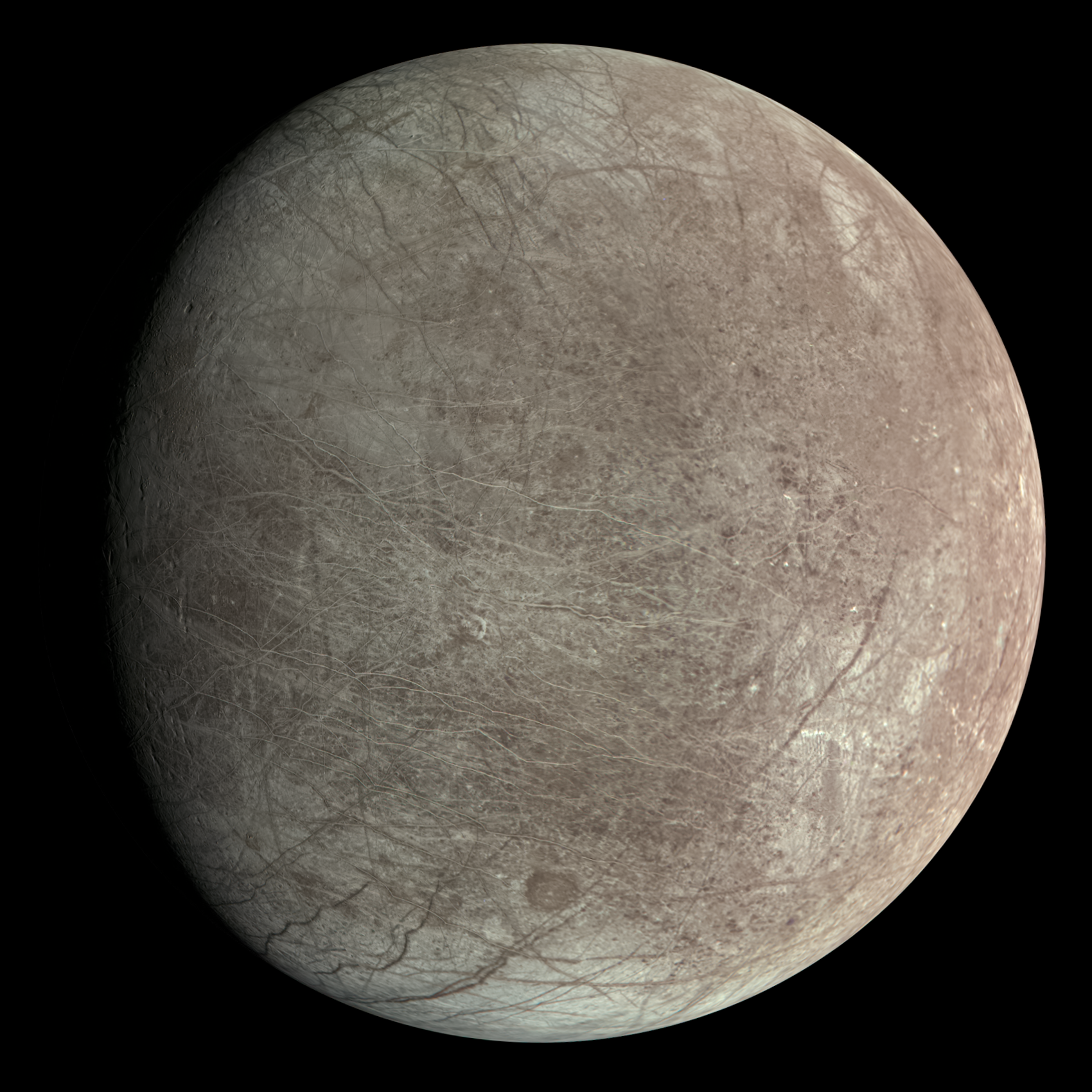
High resolution image of Europa by Juno.
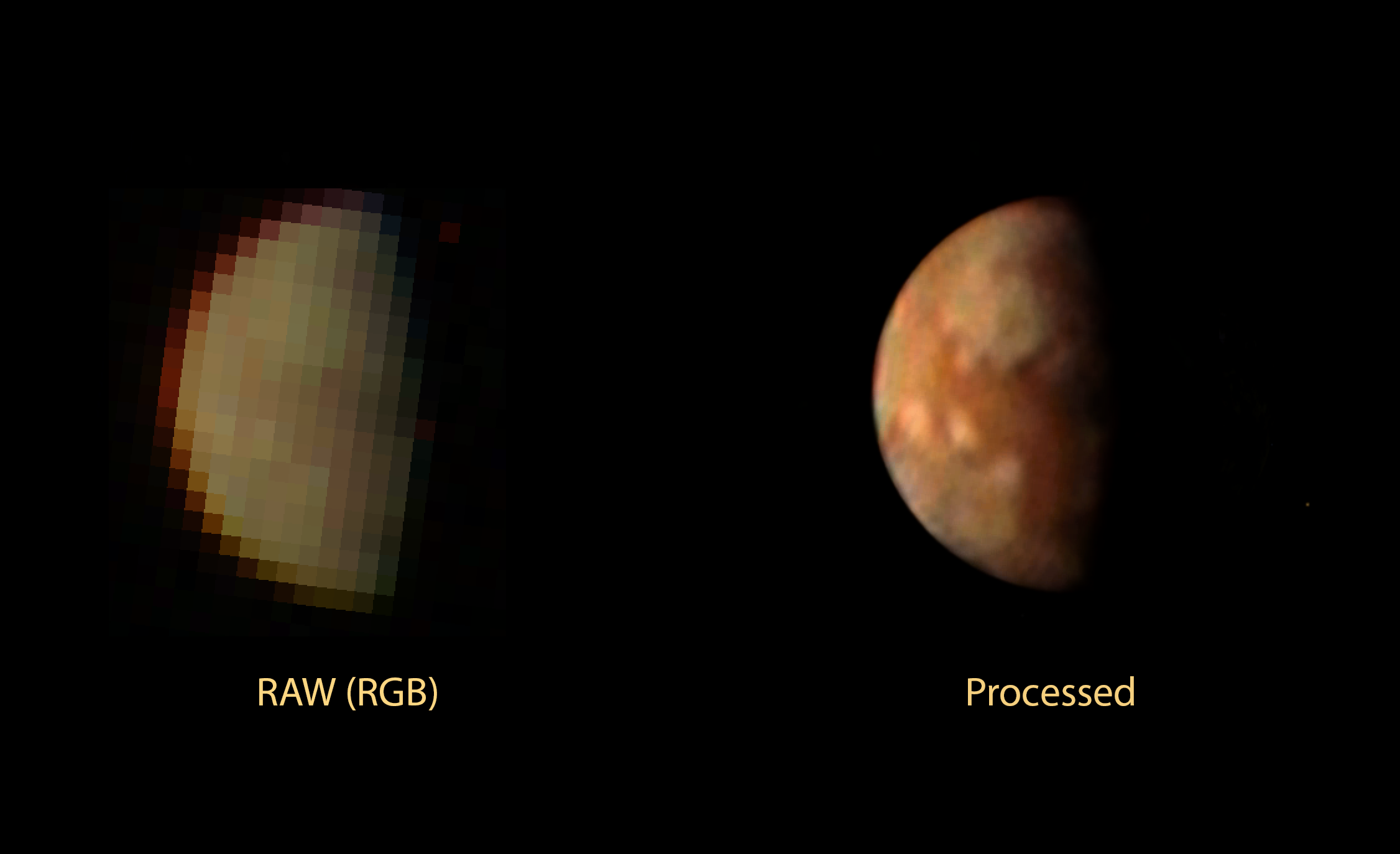
Low resolution view of Io captured by JunoCam (September 2017)

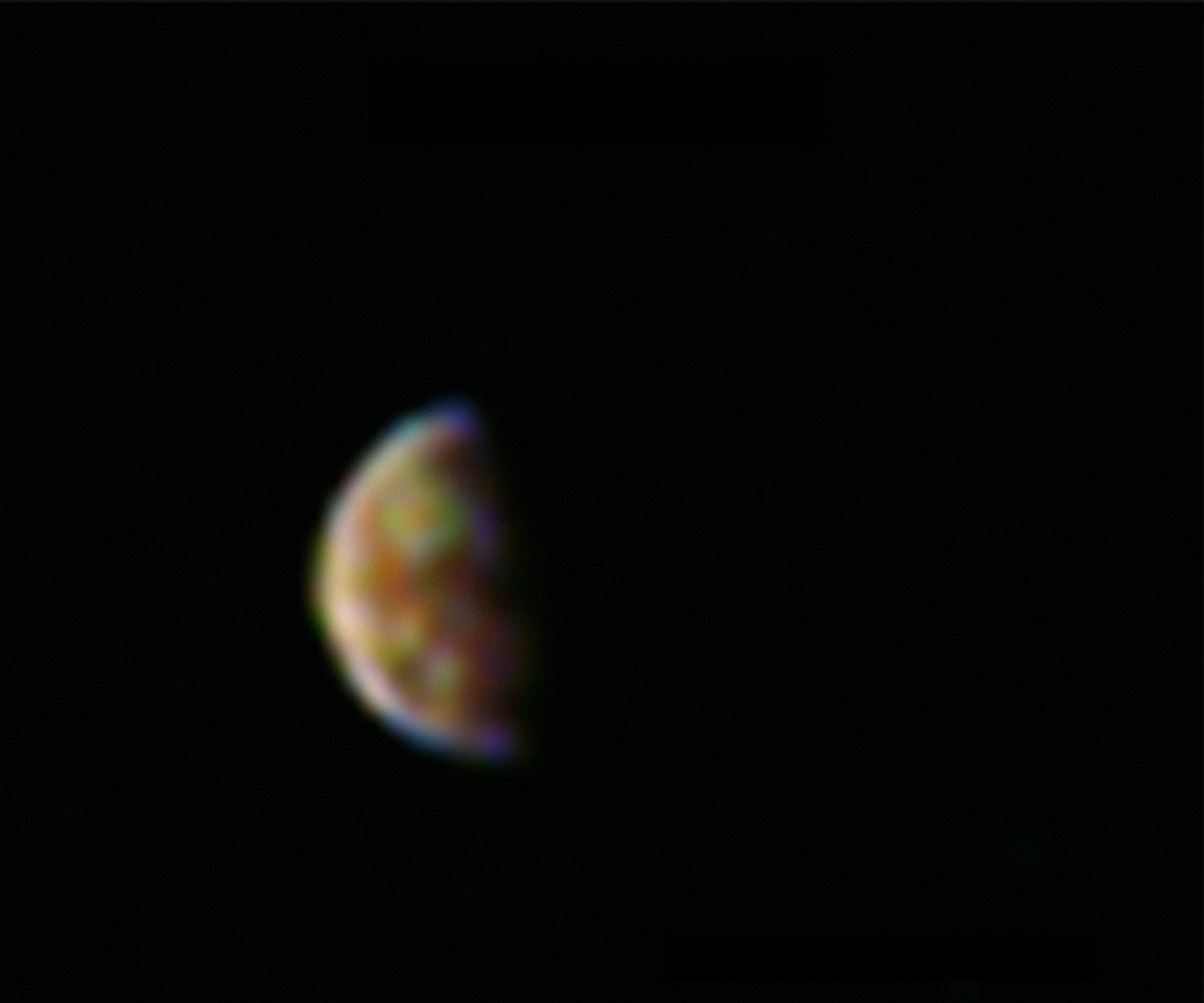
Io, as recorded by JunoCam
(2 September 2017)

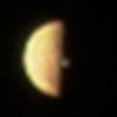
Plume near Io's terminator
(21 December 2018)

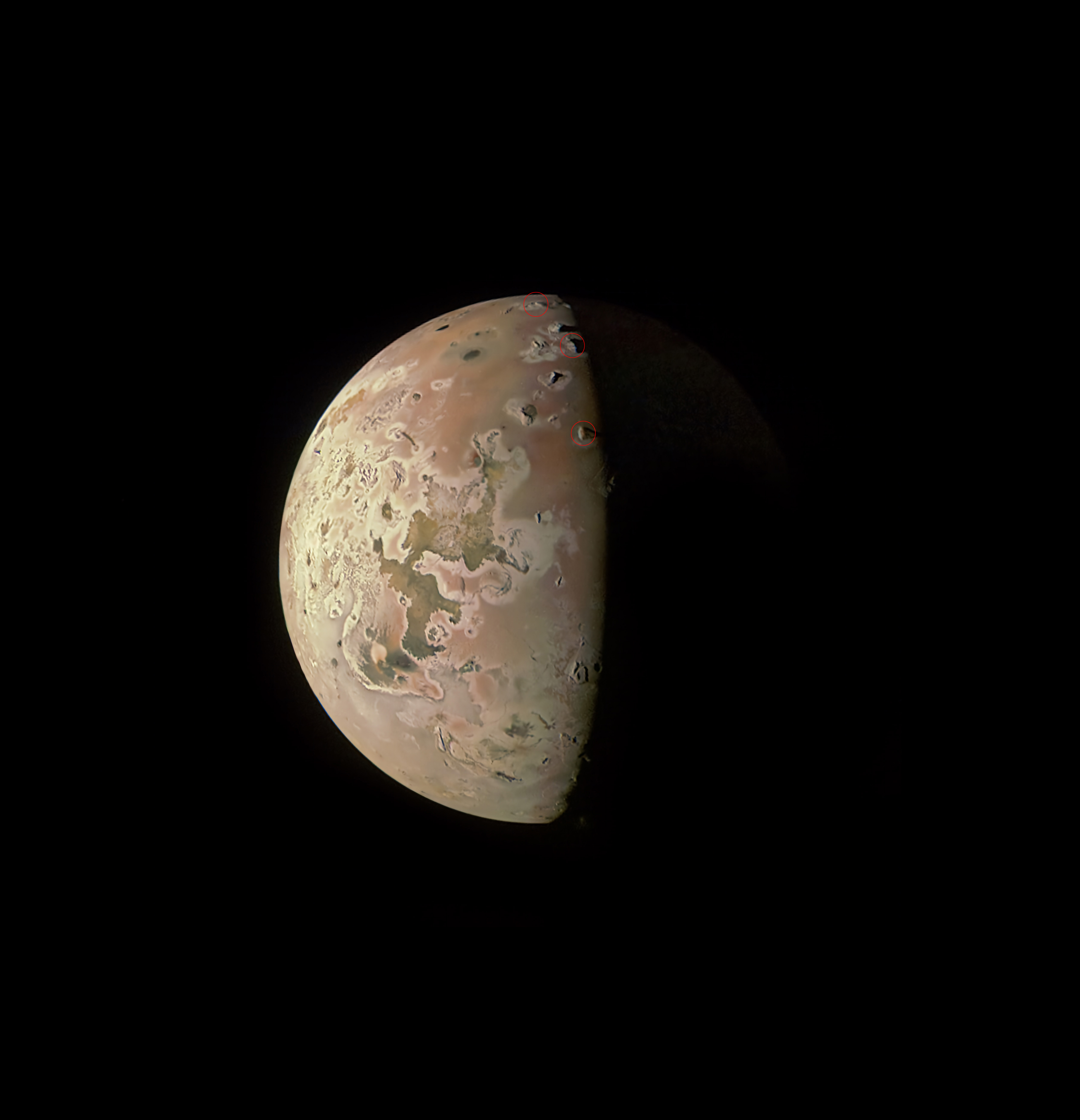
Io, viewed by JunoCam
Several Volcanos
(15 October 2023)

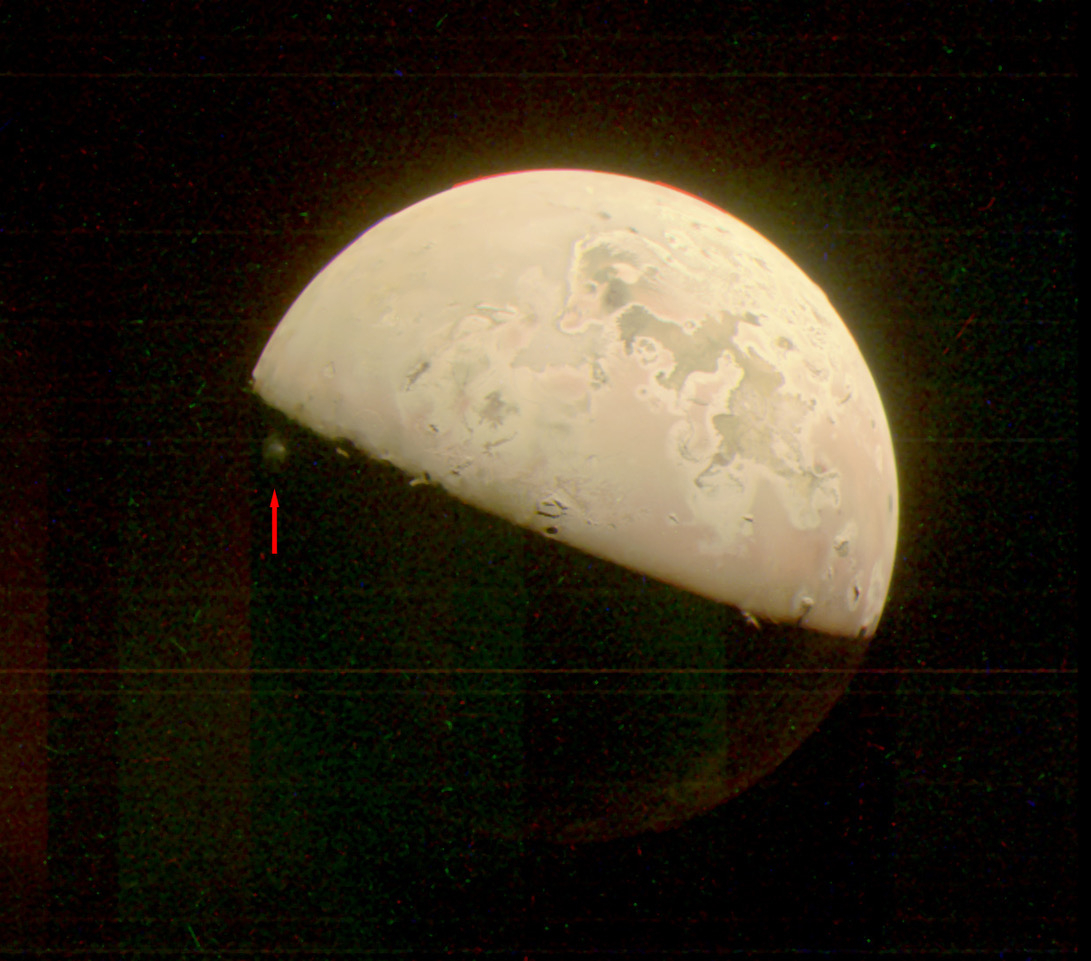
Io, viewed by JunoCam
Volcanic plume
(15 October 2023)

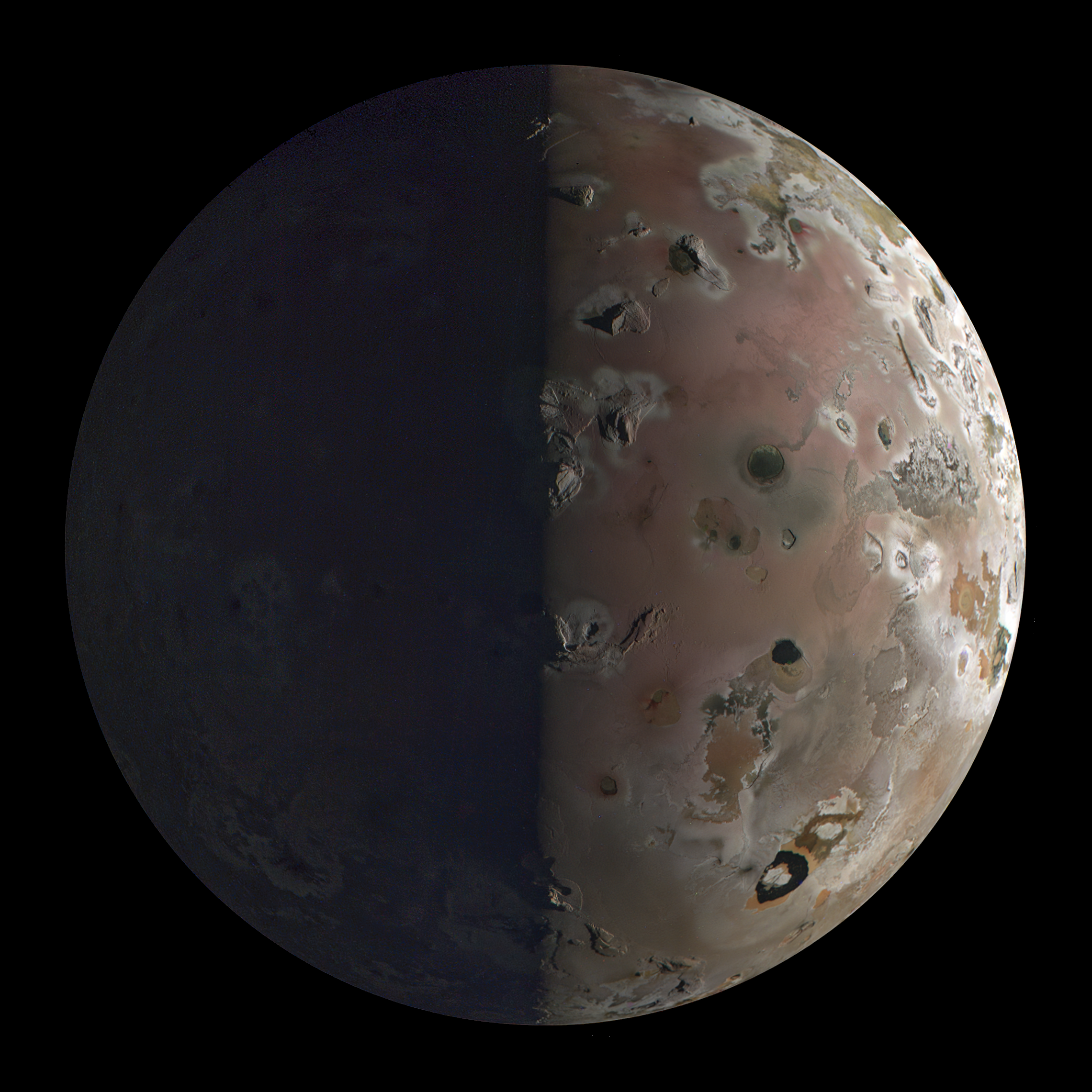
Io, taken by the JunoCam instrument during Juno's flyby
(30 December 2023)

Thebe as seen by Juno on May 1, 2026.

== See also ==
- Atmosphere of Jupiter
- Comet Shoemaker–Levy 9
- Europa Clipper
- Exploration of Jupiter
- Jupiter Icy Moons Explorer
- List of missions to the outer planets
- Moons of Jupiter
