= Waves (Juno) =

Experiment on the Juno spacecraft to study radio and plasma waves

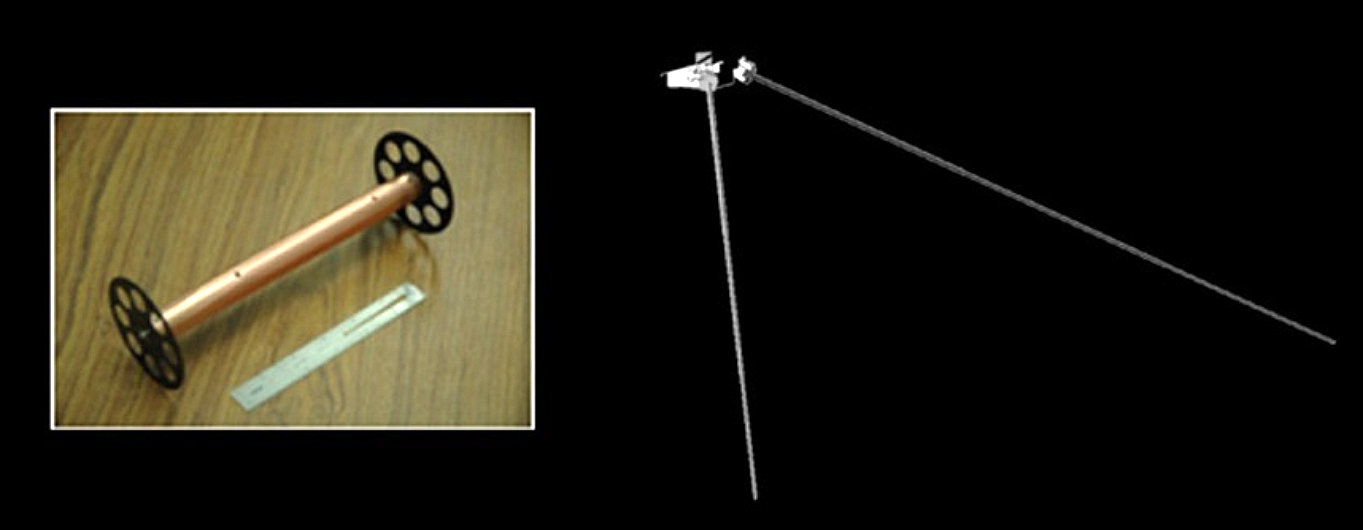
Components of Waves

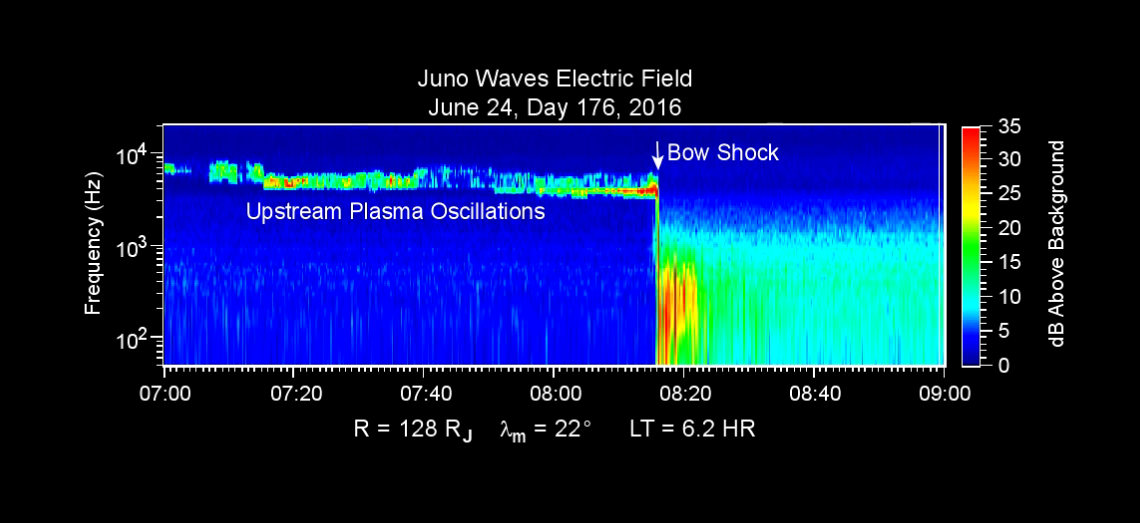
Waves data as Juno crosses the Jovian bow shock (June 2016)

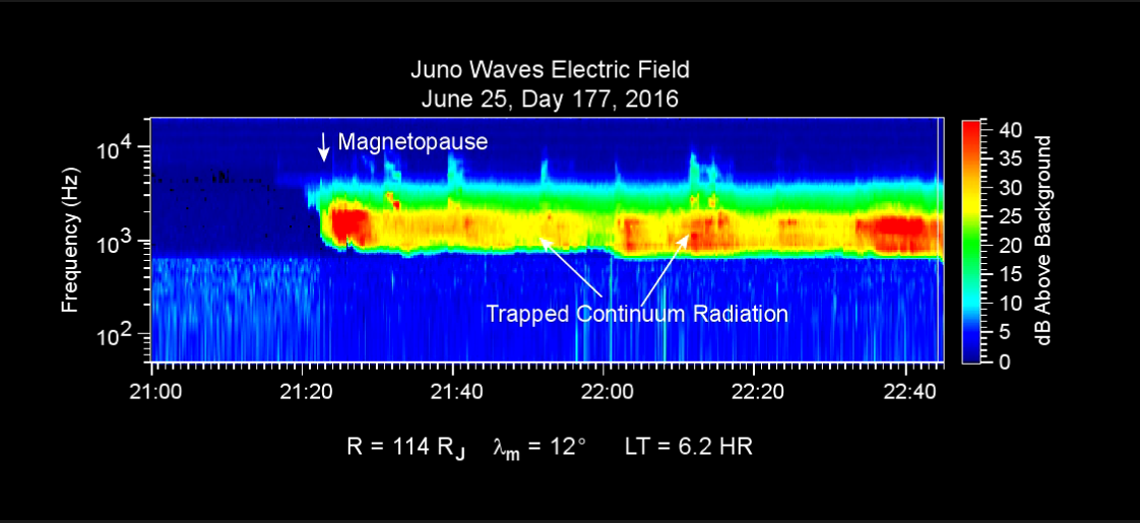
Waves data Juno enters Magnetopause (June 2016)

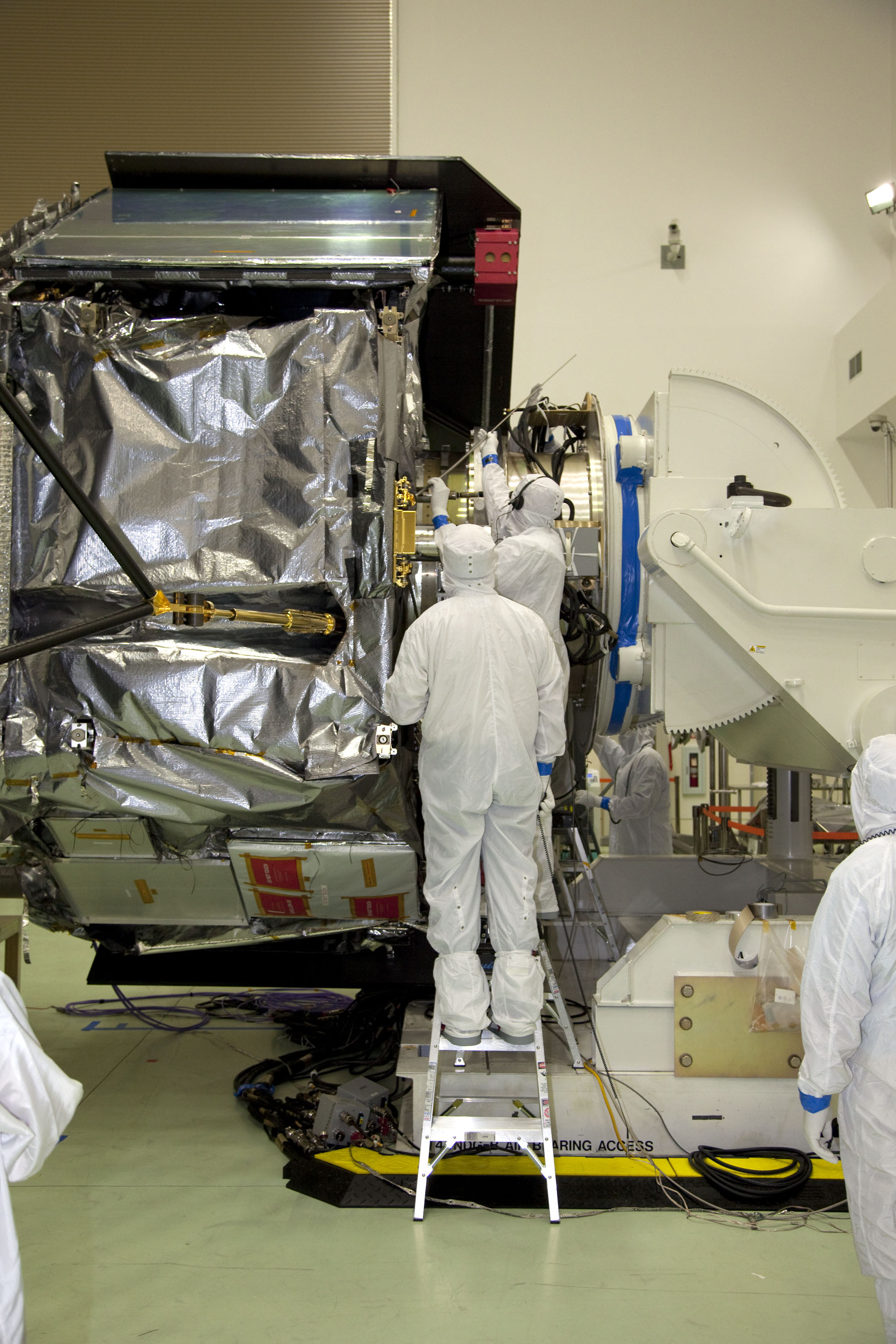
Waves being installed on Juno spacecraft

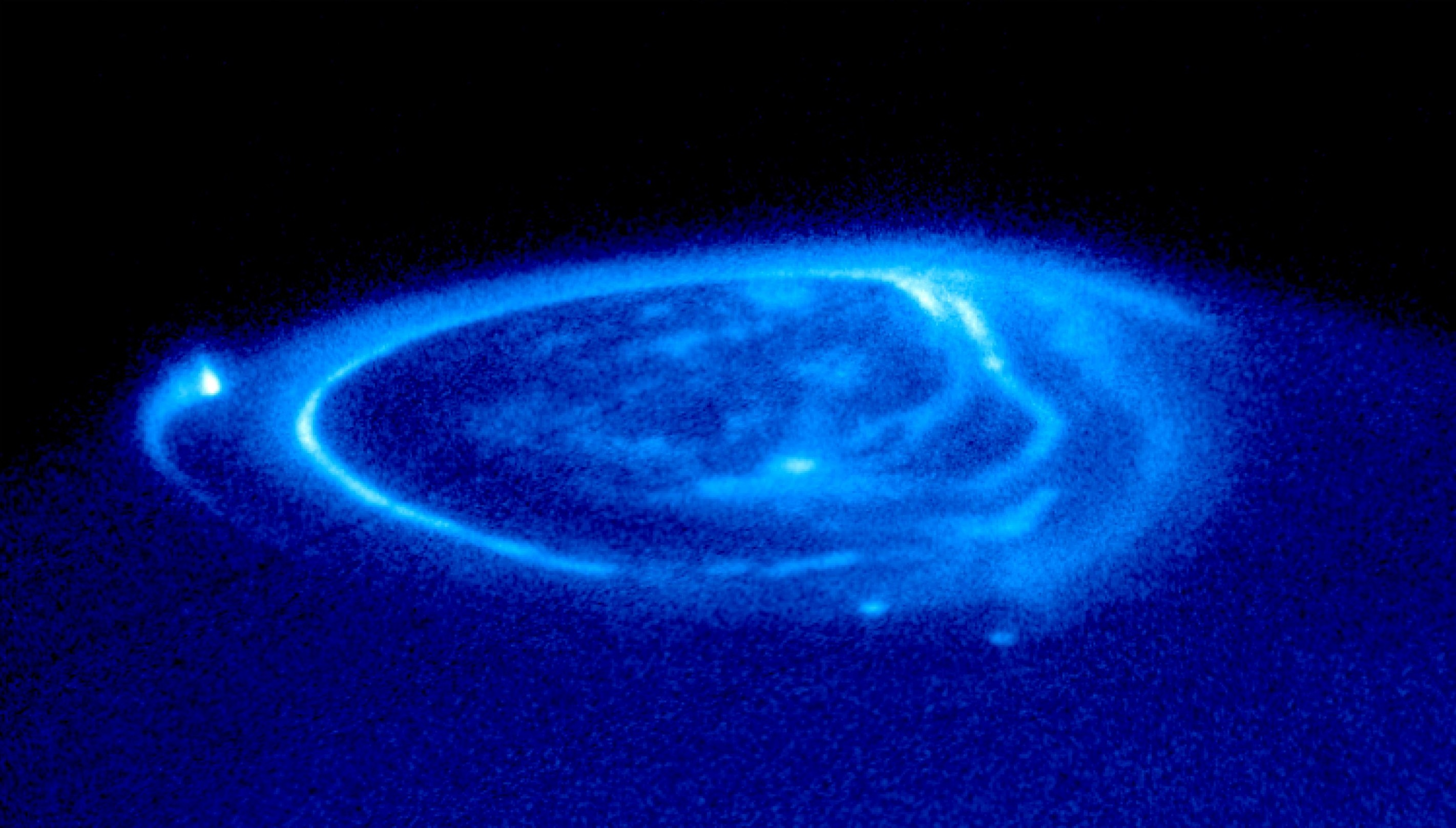
Jupiter aurora; the bright spot at far left is the end of field line to Io; spots at bottom lead to Ganymede and Europa. Captured by Hubble Space Telescope from Earth orbit in ultraviolet, represented one way to study Jupiter's aurora, which will also be studied by the Waves instrument from orbit, detecting radio and plasma waves in situ

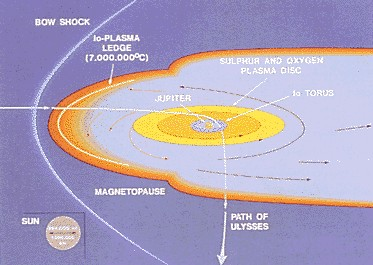
The path of the Ulysses spacecraft through the magnetosphere of Jupiter in 1992, shows the location of the Jovian bow shock.

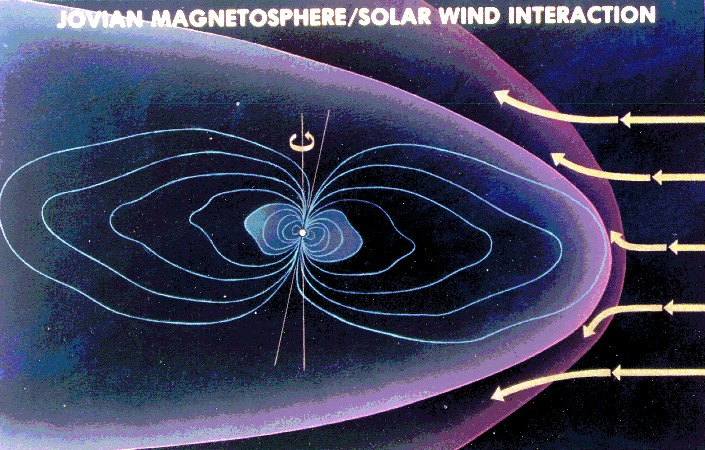
This illustration shows how the Jovian magnetosphere is thought to interact with the incoming solar wind (yellow arrows)

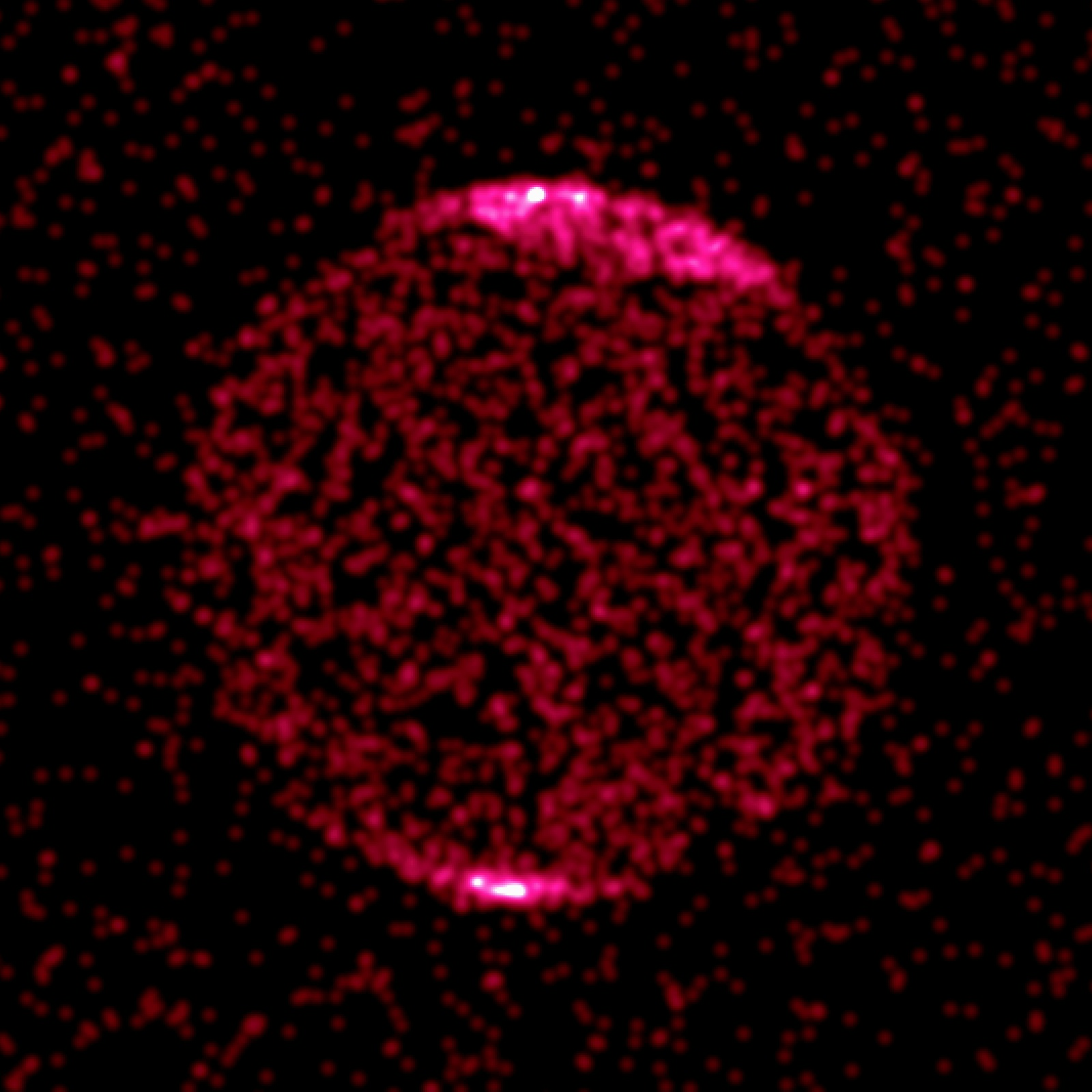
Chandra (AXAF) observation of Jupiter's X-rays gave everyone a surprise at the turn of millennium when its high-angular resolution showed that Jovian X-rays were coming from the poles

Waves is an experiment on the Juno spacecraft for studying radio and plasma waves. It is part of a collection of various types of instruments and experiments on the spacecraft; Waves is oriented towards understanding fields and particles in Jupiter's magnetosphere. Waves is on board the uncrewed Juno spacecraft, which was launched in 2011 and arrived at Jupiter in the summer of 2016. The major focus of study for Waves is Jupiter's magnetosphere, which if could be seen from Earth would be about twice the size of a full moon. The magnetosphere has a tear drop shape, and that tail extends away from the Sun by at least 5 AU (Earth-Sun distances). The Waves instrument is designed to help understand the interaction between Jupiter's atmosphere, its magnetic field, its magnetosphere, and to understand Jupiter's auroras. It is designed to detect radio frequencies from 50 Hz up to 40,000,000 Hz (40 MHz), and magnetic fields from 50 Hz to 20,000 Hz (20 kHz). It has two main sensors: a dipole antenna and a magnetic search coil. The dipole antenna has two whip antennas that extend 2.8 meters (110 inches/ 9.1 feet) and are attached to the main body of the spacecraft. This sensor has been compared to a rabbit-ear TV antenna. The search coil is overall a Mu-metal rod 15 cm (6 in) in length with a fine copper wire wound 10,000 times around it. There are also two frequency receivers that each cover certain bands. Data handling is done by two radiation-hardened systems on a chip. The data handling units are located inside the Juno Radiation Vault. Waves is allocated 410 Mbits of data per science orbit.

On June 24, 2016, the Waves instrument recorded Juno passing across Jupiter's magnetic field's bow shock. It took about two hours for the uncrewed spacecraft to cross this region of space. On June 25, 2016, it encountered the magnetopause. Juno would go on to enter Jupiter's orbit in July 2016. The magnetosphere blocks the charged particles of the solar wind, with the number of solar wind particles Juno encountered dropping 100-fold when it entered the Jovian magnetosphere. Before Juno entered it, it was encountering about 16 solar wind particles per cubic inch of space.

There are various other antennas on Juno, including the communications antennas and the antenna for the Microwave Radiometer.

Two other instruments help understand the magnetosphere of Jupiter, Jovian Auroral Distributions Experiment (JADE) and Magnetometer (MAG). The JEDI instrument measures higher energy ions and electrons and JADE lower energy ones; they are complementary. Another object of study is plasma generated by volcanism on the moon Io and Waves should help understand that phenomenon.

A primary objective of the Juno mission is to explore the polar magnetosphere of Jupiter. While Ulysses briefly attained latitudes of ~48 degrees, this was at relatively large distances from Jupiter (~8.6 RJ). Hence, the polar magnetosphere of Jupiter is largely uncharted territory and, in particular, the auroral acceleration region has never been visited. ...

— A Wave Investigation for the Juno Mission to Jupiter

One issue that came up in 2002 was when the Chandra X-ray Observatory determined with its high angular resolution that X-rays were coming from Jupiter's poles. The Einstein Observatory and Germany's ROSAT previously observed X-rays from Jupiter. The new results by Chandra, which took the observations during December 2000, showed X-rays coming from the magnetic north pole, but not the aurorae. Roughly every 45 minutes Jupiter sends out a multi-gigawatt X-ray pulse, and this is synchronized with an emission in radio at 1 to 200 kHz. The Galileo Jupiter orbiter and Ulysses solar orbiter picked up the radio emissions every 45 minutes. The radio emissions were discovered before the X-rays (they have been detected since the 1950s), and there is even a citizen astronomy project organized by NASA called Radio Jove for anyone to listen to Jupiter's radio signals. Kilometric radio radiation was not detected until the Voyager flybys of Jupiter in the late 1970s. Two candidates for the source of the X-rays are particles of solar wind and particles from Io.

Waves was developed at the University of Iowa, and the experiment is led by a research scientist there.

== Sensors ==
There are two main sensors for Waves, and these field signals to the frequency receivers. Both sensors are attached to the main spacecraft body.

- Dipole antenna
- Magnetic search coil

The MSC is made of a rod of Mu-metal (a ferromagnetic alloy of nickel and iron) wrapped in fine copper wire.

== Frequency receiver ==
There are two frequency receivers that each cover certain bands, a high band and a low band, which in turn has different receiving sections. The receivers are housed in the Juno Radiation Vault along with other electronics.

Breakdown:

- High Frequency Receiver
  - High Frequency Receiver ~100 kHz - 40 MHz (Spectrum (High) and Waveform (Low))
  - High Frequency Waveform Receiver
    - Baseband receiver includes:
      - variable-gain amplifier
      - 100 Hz to 3 MHz band-pass filter
      - 12-bit analog-to-digital converter
    - Double sideband heterodyne receiver for 3 to 40 MHz (swept frequency receiver)
- Low Frequency Receiver
  - High, Low Frequency Receiver ~10 kHz - 150 kHz (E waveform)
  - Low, Low Frequency Receiver ~50 Hz - 20 kHz (E and B waveforms)

All outputs are sent to the Data Processing Unit (DPU)

== Data Processing Unit (DPU) ==
The output from the frequency receivers is in turn processed by the Juno DPU. The DPU has two microprocessors that use field programmable gate arrays are they are both system on chip designs. The two chips:

- Y180 intellectual property core
- Floating point arithmetic unit

The DPU sends data to the main Juno computer for communication with Earth. The electronics are in the Juno Radiation Vault along with the receivers.

== Multimedia ==
Waves has detected radio emissions from the Jupiter auroras, the most powerful known in the Solar System to date.

This video with sound translates the radio frequency into sound waves, and includes an infographic of those sounds as it replays. The video was created with data recorded by the Waves instrument

== See also ==
- Other instruments on Juno
  - Microwave Radiometer
  - Jovian Infrared Auroral Mapper
  - Magnetometer
  - Gravity Science
  - Jovian Auroral Distributions Experiment
  - Jovian Energetic Particle Detector Instrument
  - Ultraviolet Imaging Spectrograph
  - JunoCam (Public outreach camera)
- Radio
- Plasma
- Waves in plasmas
- Ulysses (spacecraft)
- Magnetosphere of Jupiter
- Radio astronomy
- FIELDS (investigation on the Parker Solar Probe, launched summer of 2018)
- Plasma Wave Subsystem (Instrument on the Voyager probes)
