= Jovian Auroral Distributions Experiment =

Plasma spectrometer aboard the Juno spacecraft

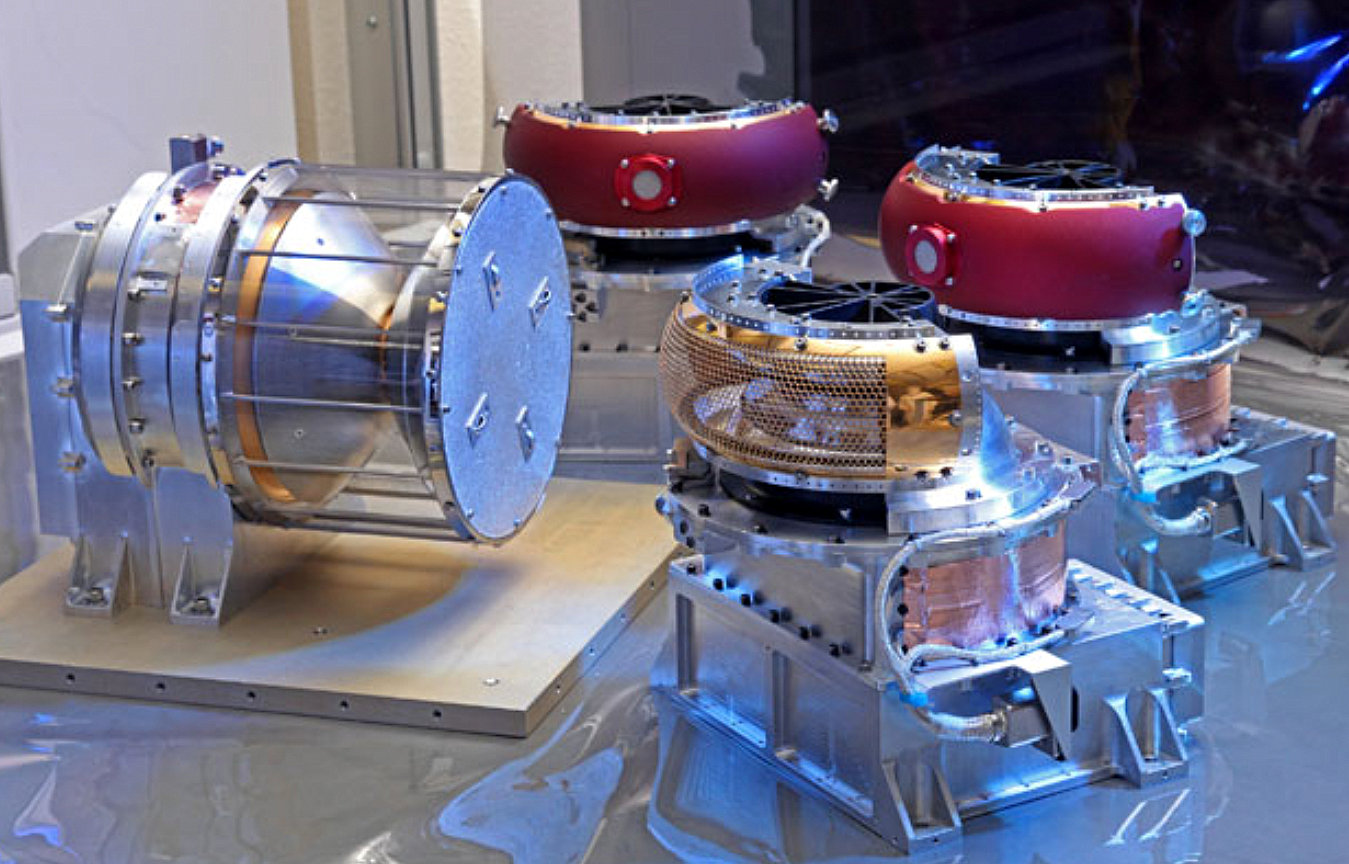
Sensors for JADE

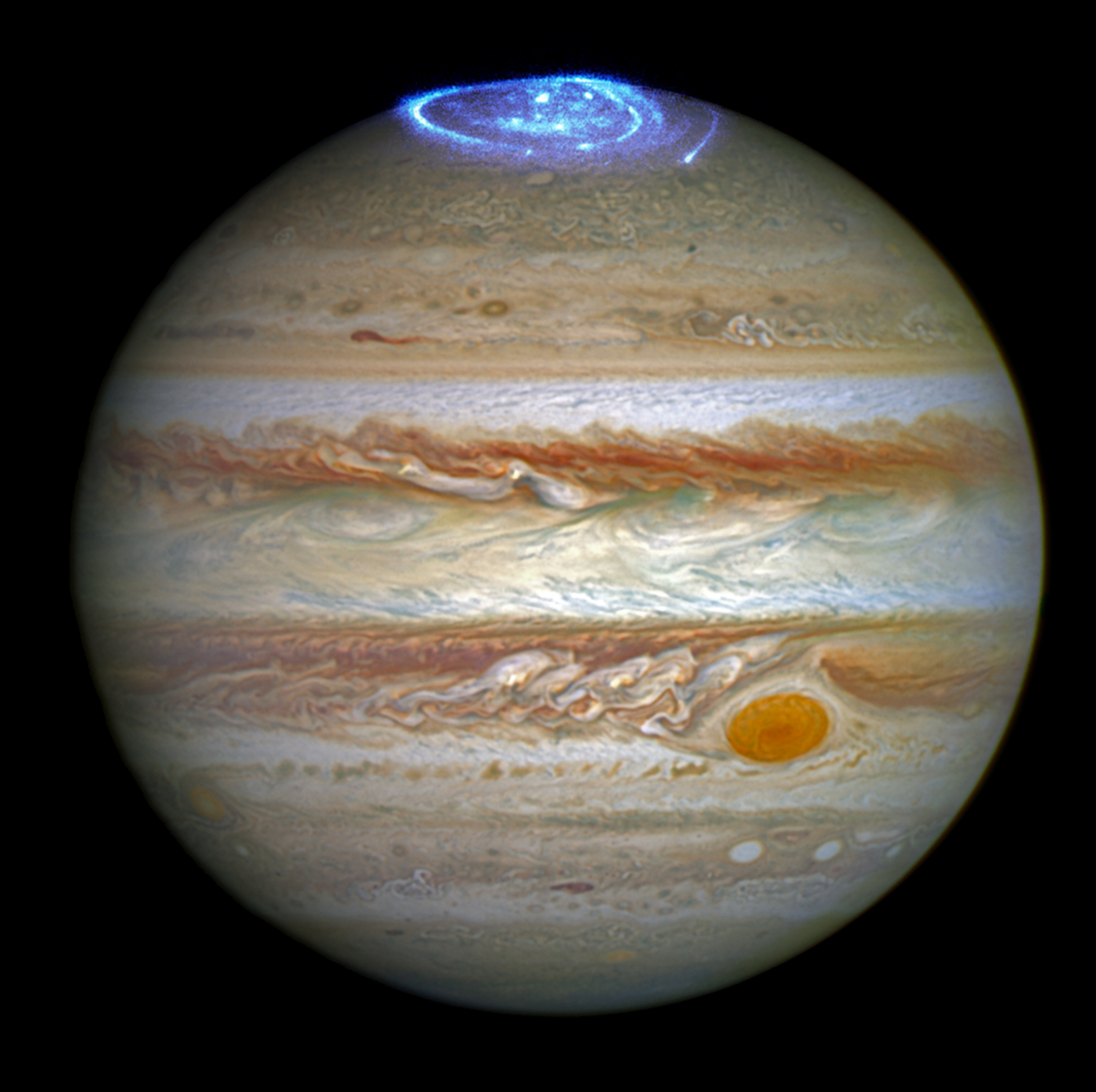
JADE will collect data on Jupiter's aurora, shown in this space telescope image with aurora overlaid

Jovian Auroral Distributions Experiment (JADE) is an instrument that detects and measures ions and electrons around the spacecraft. It is a suite of detectors on the Juno Jupiter orbiter (launched 2011, orbiting Jupiter since 2016). JADE includes JADE-E, JADE-I, and the EBox. JADE-E and JADE-I are sensors that are spread out on the spacecraft, and the EBox is located inside the Juno Radiation Vault. EBox stands for Electronics Box. JADE-E is for detecting electrons from 0.1 to 100 keV, and there are three JADE-E sensors on Juno. JADE-I is for detecting ions from 5 eV to 50 keV. It is designed to return data in situ on Jupiter's auroral region and magnetospheric plasmas, by observing electrons and ions in this region. It is primarily focused on Jupiter, but it was turned on in January 2016 while still en route to study inter-planetary space (when it was still several million miles from Jupiter at that time).

JADE was built by Southwest Research Institute (SwRI), located in the United States in Texas. Two other instruments help understand the magnetosphere of Jupiter, WAVES and MAG. The JEDI instrument measures higher energy ions and electrons and JADE lower energy ones; therefore they are complementary.

The JADE sensors, in addition to other materials, also use a special plastic designed to endure the spaceflight conditions. The instrument uses special molded rings of polyether ether ketone (PEEK).

By May 2017, some of the first scientific analyses reported that JADE observed plasma coming up from the upper atmosphere of Jupiter into the magnetosphere. Some auroral processes were compared to the ones on Earth, but there seemed to be other processes at work creating the auroras at Jupiter, according to the JADE project leader, in early 2017. Like Earth's aurorae, scientists noted Jupiter's could be affected by the Solar wind; however, many of the ions in the Jupiter aurorae were different from those in Earth's.

== JADE-E ==
Each of the three JADE-E electron sensors weighs 5.25 kg (11.57 pounds, 0.827 stones) with dimensions of 21 cm on all sides;

Each JADE-E sensor includes:

- top-hat electrostatic analyzer
- two deflectors
- Multi-channel plate detector
- anode ring

== JADE-I ==
The one JADE-I sensors is a spherical top hat electrostatic analyzer combined with a time-of-flight mass spectrometer. The sensor is made of nickel plated titanium metal. JADE-I sensor weighs 7.55 Kilograms(16.65 pounds, 1.1889 stones).

JADE-I can measure ions from 1 to 50 atomic mass units (AMU), with the ability to discern atomic hydrogen, H_{2}^{+}, H_{3}^{+}, oxygen and sulfur.

== See also ==
- JEDI
- JunoCam
- Van Allen Probes (also studies ions)
- MAVEN
- UVS (Juno)
- Microwave Radiometer (Juno)
- Waves (Juno)
- Gravity Science
- SWEAP (measures ions and electrons on the Parker Solar Probe)
- SWAP (New Horizons), measures the Solar Wind on the New Horizons mission to Pluto and beyond
- Pluto Energetic Particle Spectrometer Science Investigation (detects on ions on New Horizons)
