= Microwave Radiometer (Juno) =

Instrument observing deep into Jupiter's atmosphere

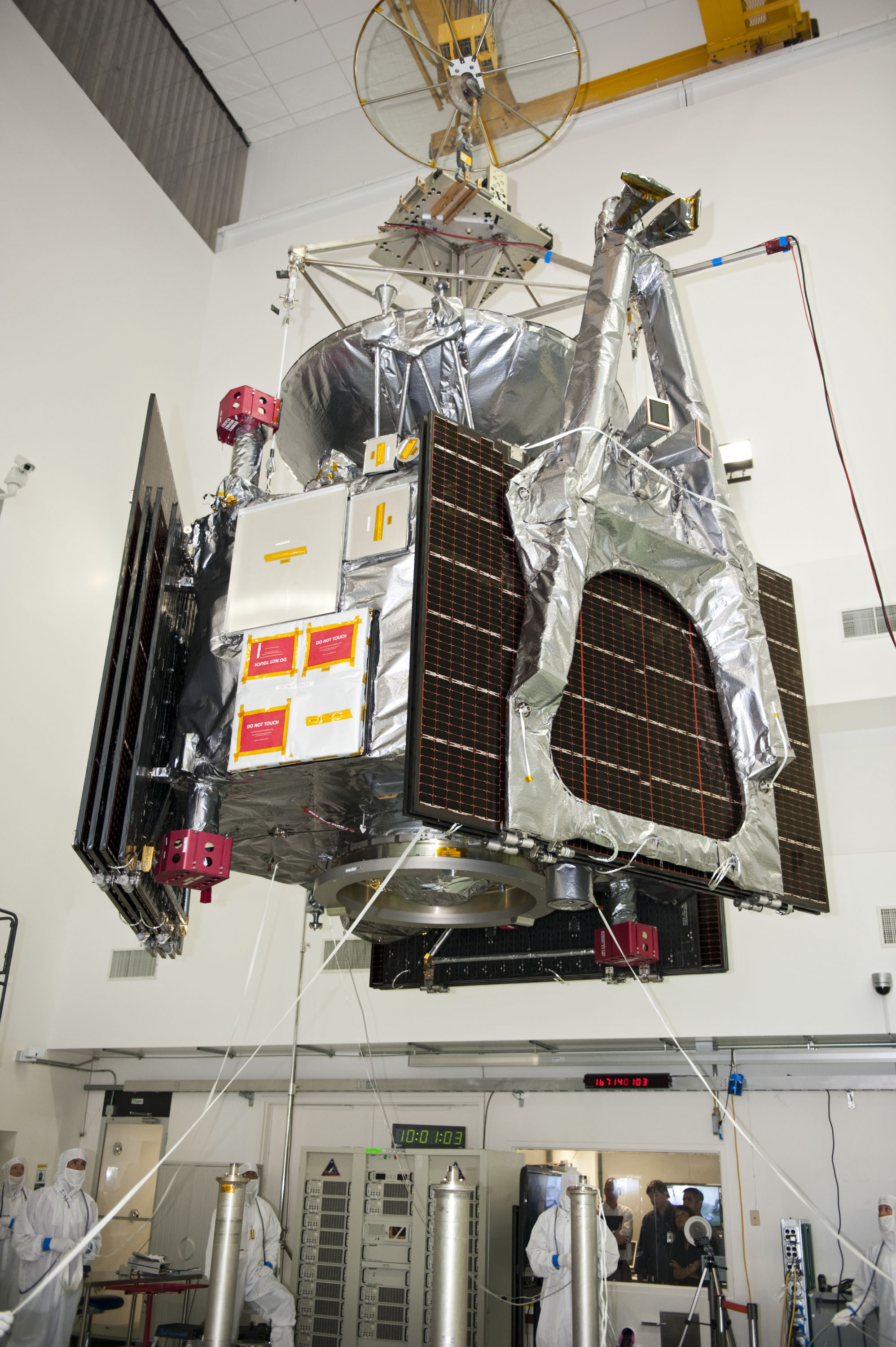
In this view several white squares of different sizes can be seen on the side of the spacecraft;this side has five of the six MWR antennas. The triangular boom on the right is the Magnetometer (MAG) instrument

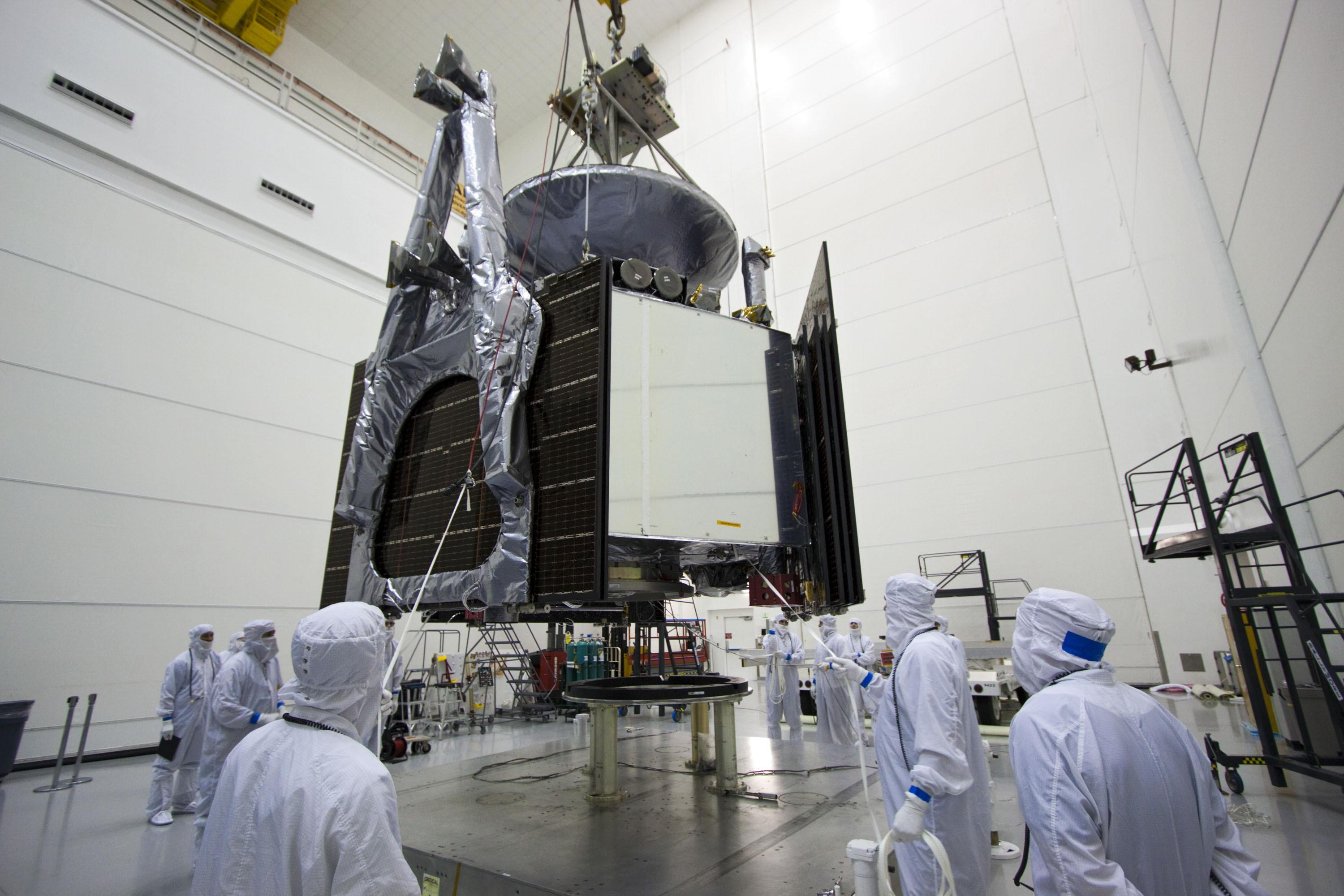
The white square is the biggest MWR antenna, and takes up another side of the spacecraft. This antenna is for 600 MHz.

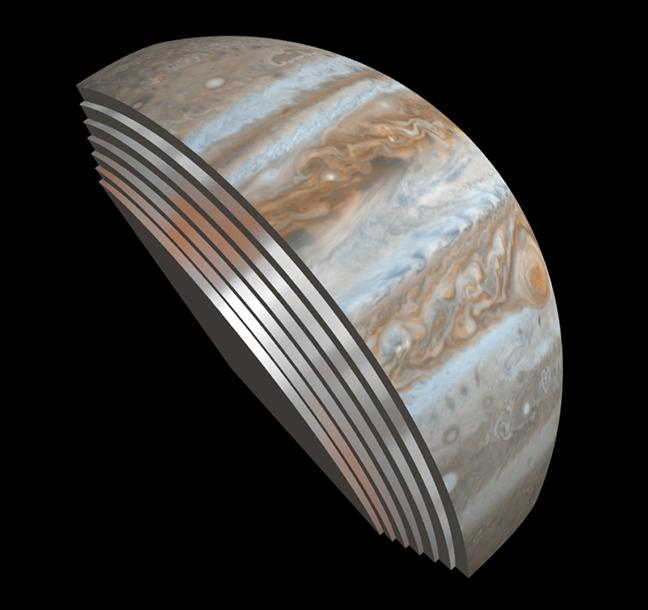
This visualization released by NASA depicts the layers that MWR will observe below the top visible cloud layer

Microwave Radiometer (MWR) is an instrument on the Juno orbiter sent to planet Jupiter. MWR is a multi-wavelength microwave radiometer for making observations of Jupiter's deep atmosphere. MWR can observe radiation from 1.37 to 50 cm in wavelength, from 600 MHz to 22 GHz in frequencies. This supports its goal of observing the previously unseen atmospheric features and chemical abundances hundreds of miles or kilometers into Jupiter's atmosphere. MWR is designed to detect six different frequencies in that range using separate antennas.

MWR views Jupiter's microwave radiation so it can see up to hundreds of miles deep into the planet. In August 2016, as Juno swung closely by the planet MWR achieved a penetration of 200 to 250 miles (350 to 400 kilometers) below the surface cloud layer. MWR is designed to make observations below the cloud-tops, especially detecting the abundances of certain chemicals and determining dynamic features. These depths have not been observed before.

MWR was launched aboard the Juno spacecraft on August 5, 2011 (UTC) from Cape Canaveral, USA, as part of the New Frontiers program, and after an interplanetary journey that including a swingby of Earth, entered a polar orbit of Jupiter on July 5, 2016 (UTC),

The electronics for MWR are located inside the Juno Radiation Vault, which uses titanium to protect it and other spacecraft electronics. The antennas and transmission lines are designed to handle the radiation environment at Jupiter so the instrument can function.

== Goals ==
Determining the features and abundances of oxygen, nitrogen, and sulfur at up to 100 bar of pressure (1451 psi) will shed light on the origins and nature of Jupiter. MWR is also designed to detect the amount of water and ammonia deep inside Jupiter. It should also be able to provide a temperature profile of atmosphere down to 200 bar (2901 psi). Overall MWR is designed to look down as deep as roughly 1,000 atmospheres (or bar or kPa), which is about 342 miles (550 kilometers) down inside Jupiter. (1 bar is roughly the pressure at Earth sea level, 14.6 psi.)

One of the molecules MWR is intended to look for inside Jupiter is water, which it is hoped will help explain the formation of the Solar System. By probing the interior, the insights may reveal how and where Jupiter formed, in turn shedding light on the formation of the Earth.

At the time of its use in the 2010s, it was one of only four microwave radiometers to have been flown on interplanetary spacecraft. The first was Mariner 2, which used a microwave instrument to determine the high surface temperature of Venus was coming from the surface not higher up in the atmosphere. There were also radiometer-type instruments on the Rosetta comet probe, and Cassini-Huygens. Previously, the Galileo probe directly measured Jupiter's atmosphere in situ as it descended into the atmosphere, but only down to 22 bars of pressure. However, MWR is designed to look down as deep as 1000 bar of pressure. (1000 bar is about 14,500 psi, or 100000 kPa)

== Antennas ==
MWR has six separate antennas of different size that are mounted to the sides of the Juno spacecraft body. As the spacecraft turns (it is a spin-stabilzed spacecraft) each antenna takes a "swath" of observations of the giant. Five of the six antennas are all on one side of the spacecraft. The sixth and biggest antenna entirely fills another side the Juno body.

MWR antennas: There are two patch array antennas, three slot arrays, and one horn antenna.

- 600 MHz/0.6 GHz frequency/50 cm wavelength (biggest antenna takes up one side of spacecraft body and is a patch array antenna)
- 1.2 GHz (also a patch array antenna, but located with other five antennas on one side)
- 2.4 GHz (waveguide slot array)
- 4.8 GHz (waveguide slot array)
- 9.6 GHz (waveguide slot array)
- 22 GHz frequency/1.3 cm light wavelength (horn antenna on upper deck of Juno)

As Juno turns the antennas sweep across Jupiter, each frequency/wavelength capable of seeing a certain distance below the visible cloud tops.

See also Reflective array antenna and Slot antenna

== Results ==
During a close pass in summer of 2017 when MWR was operated at Jupiter, it detected temperature changes deep within the Great Red Spot (GRS) storm. On Perijove 7, which was the sixth science orbit MWR took readings of Jupiter's great red storm down to dozens of kilometers/miles of depth below the surface layers.

The distribution of ammonia gas was reported on in 2017, and analyzed. An ammonia rich layer was identified, as well as a belt of ammonia poor atmosphere from 5 to 20 degrees north.

During the first eight orbits, MWR detected hundreds of lightning discharges, mostly in the polar regions.

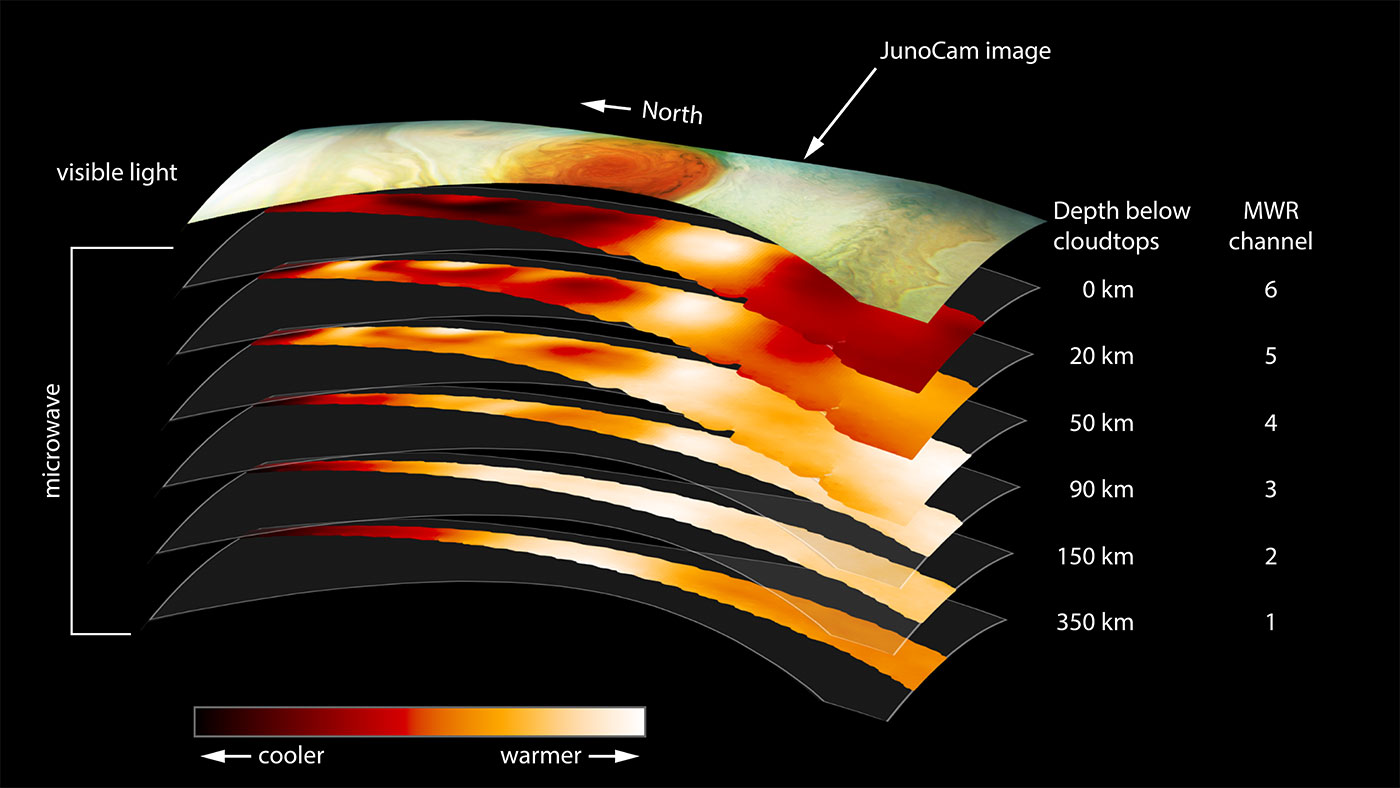
Layers of the Jovian atmosphere and corresponding MWR channels

== See also ==
- Galileo probe (in situ Atmospheric probe for Jupiter, entered and descended in 1995)
- Gravity Science
- Jovian Auroral Distributions Experiment
- Waves (Juno)
