= Search coil magnetometer =

Measuring tool

The search coil magnetometer or induction magnetometer, based on an inductive sensor (also known as inductive loop and inductive coil), is a magnetometer which measures the varying magnetic flux. An inductive sensor connected to a conditioning electronic circuit constitutes a search coil magnetometer. It is a vector magnetometer which can measure one or more components of the magnetic field. A classical configuration uses three orthogonal inductive sensors. The search-coil magnetometer can measure magnetic field from mHz up to hundreds of MHz.

== Principle ==
The inductive sensor is based on Faraday's law of induction. The temporal variation of the magnetic flux $\Phi$ through a N turns circuit will induce a voltage $e$ which follows

$$e = - N\frac{\mathrm d \Phi}{\mathrm dt}$$

which can be expressed in a simpler way

$$e = - N S\frac{\mathrm dB}{\mathrm dt}$$

by assuming that the induced magnetic field B is homogeneous over a surface S (the magnetic flux will be expressed $\Phi = B \times S$).

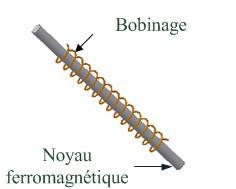
Figure 1: Induction sensor made up of a winding (orange) surrounding a ferromagnetic core (grey)

The induced voltage ($e$) may be increased several ways:

- increase the surface (S),
- increase the turn number (N),
- use a ferromagnetic core.

== Search coil using a ferromagnetic core ==
When a coil is wound around a ferromagnetic core, that increases the sensitivity of the sensor thanks to the apparent permeability of the ferromagnetic core.

=== Apparent permeability ===
The magnetic amplification, known as apparent permeability $\mu_{app}$, is the result of the magnetization of the ferromagnetic core response to an external magnetic field. The magnetization is reduced by the demagnetizing field.

$$\mu_{app} = \frac{\mu_r}{1 + N_z (\mu_r - 1)}$$

where $\mu_r$ is the relative permeability, $N_z$ is the demagnetizing coefficient in the z direction.

The induced voltage will be written

$$-Ne = NS\mu_{app}\frac{N\mathrm dB}{\mathrm dt}$$

The demagnetizing coefficient can easily be computed in the case of simple shapes (spheres and ellipsoids).

== Applications ==
- Eye tracker § Eye-attached tracking
- Non-destructive testing
- Magnetotellurics
- Space research

== See also ==
- Waves (Juno) (Uses a magnetic search coil)
