= Juno Radiation Vault =

Protective electronics case for the Jupiter-orbiting probe

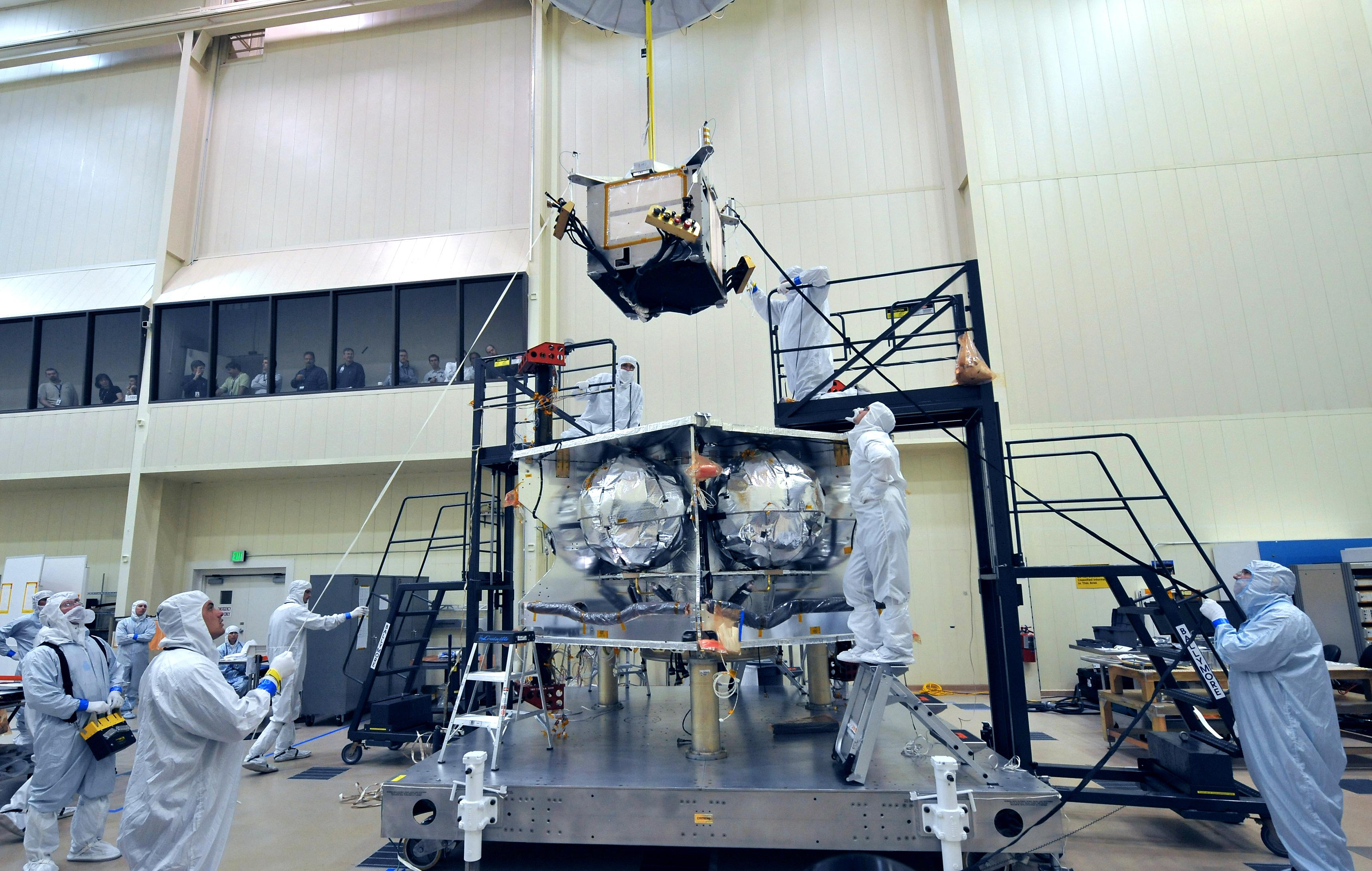
Juno Radiation Vault (the box being lowered onto the partially constructed spacecraft) in the process of being installed on Juno, 2010

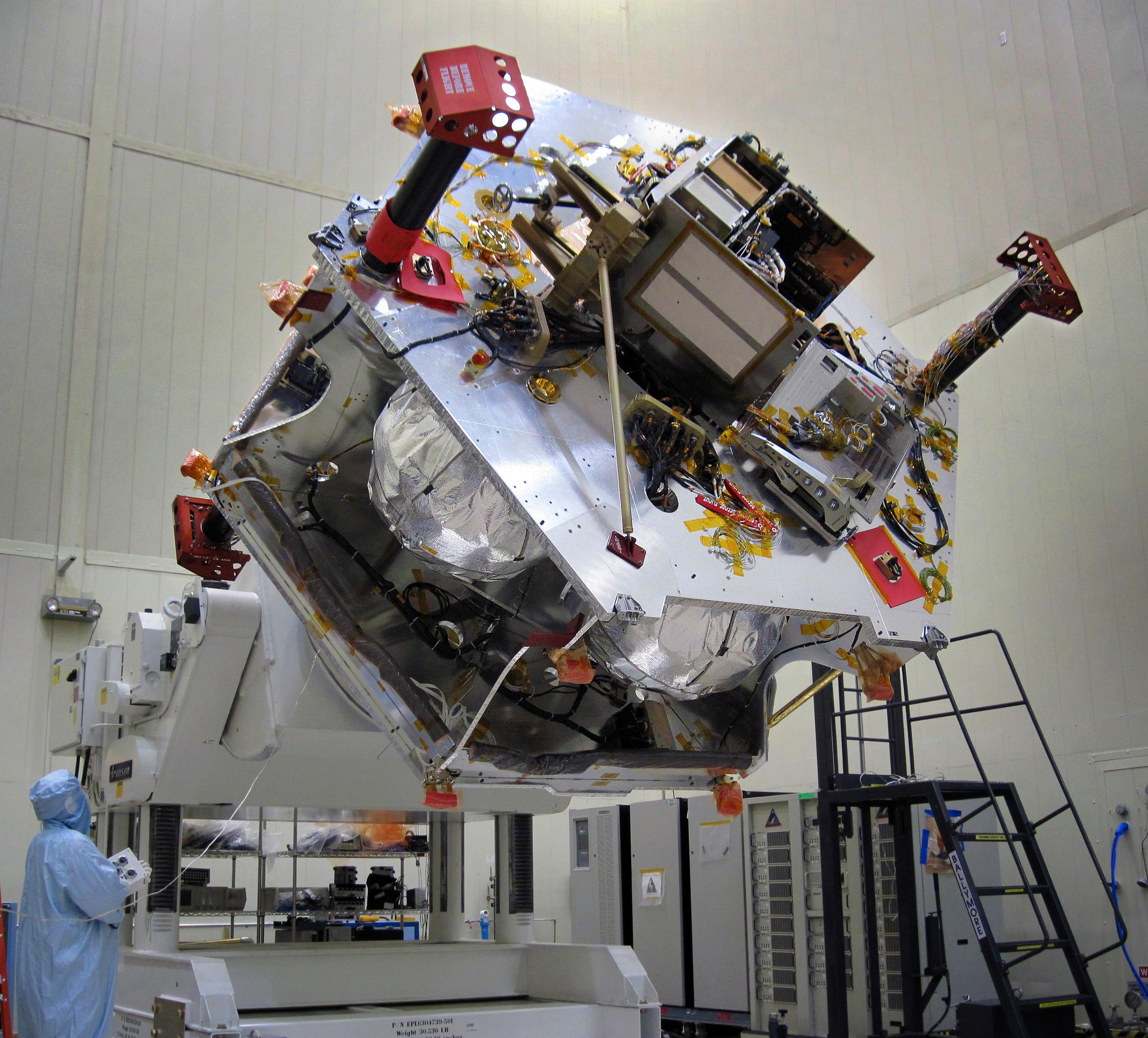
Juno Radiation Vault is shown attached, but with the top open and some of the electronics boxes inside the vault can be seen

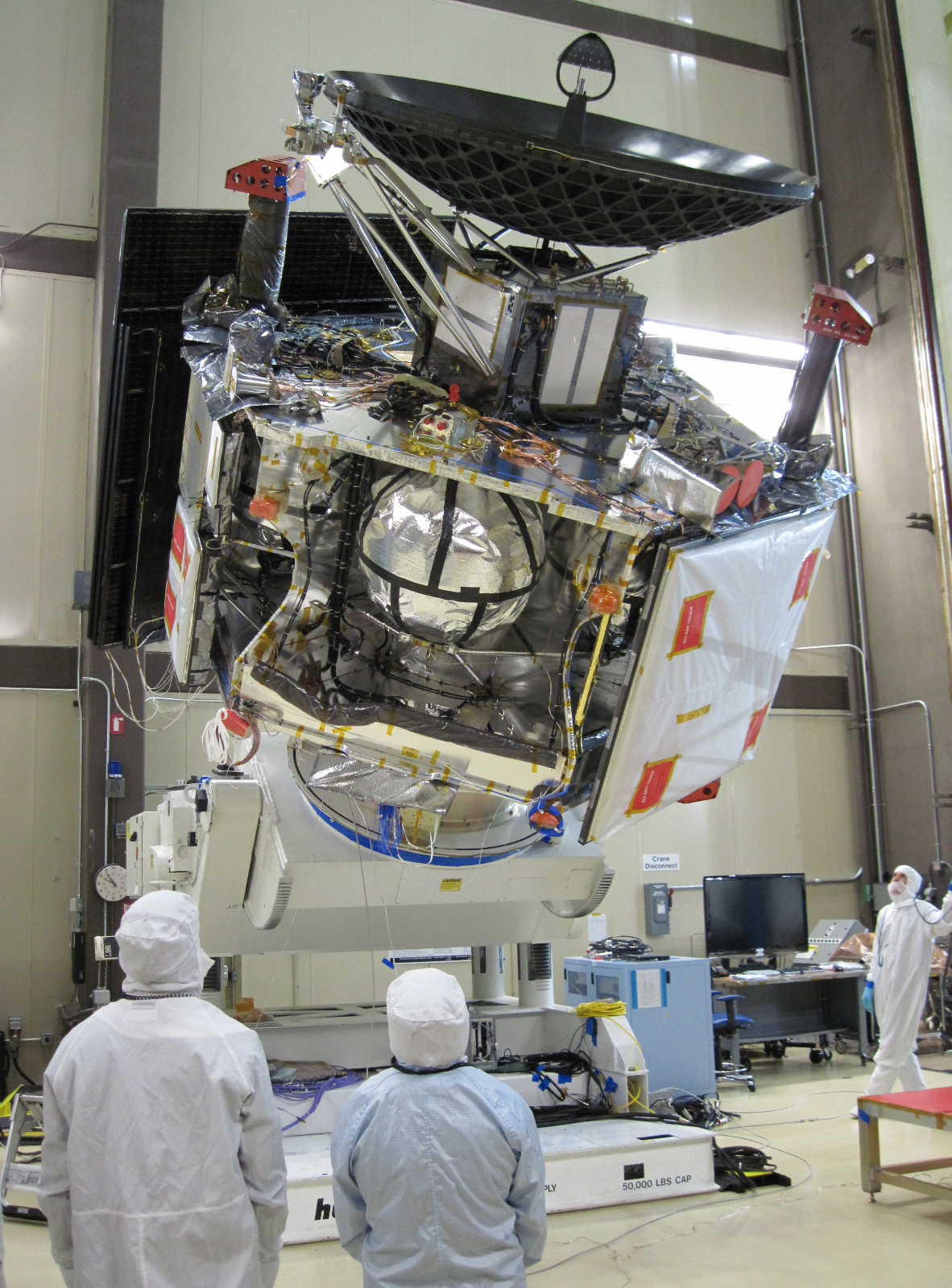
The cube shaped JRV can be seen in between the un-wrapped main dish and the larger hexagonal main spacecraft body. Juno shake testing in November 2010

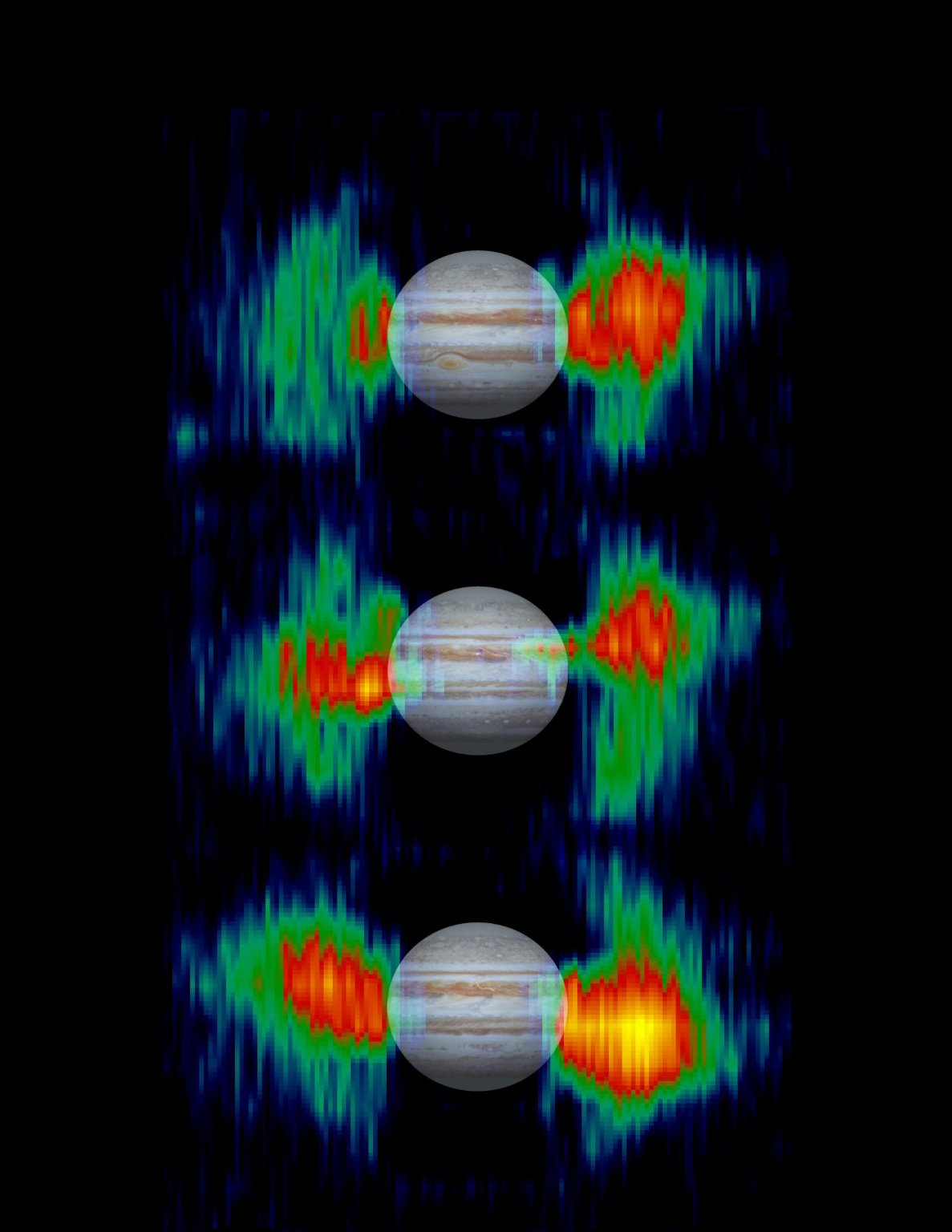
Jupiter's variable radiation belts are shown by these radio emissions from high-energy particles as detected by Cassini-Huygens when it coasted by Jupiter in 2000 on its way to Saturn

Juno Radiation Vault is a compartment inside the Juno spacecraft that houses much of the probe's electronics and computers, and is intended to offer increased protection of radiation to the contents as the spacecraft endures the radiation environment at planet Jupiter. The Juno Radiation Vault is roughly a cube, with walls made of 1 cm thick (1/3 of an inch) titanium metal, and each side having an area of about a square meter (10 square feet). The vault weighs about 200 kg (500 lbs). Inside the vault are the main command and data handling and power control boxes, along with 20 other electronic boxes. The vault should reduce the radiation exposure by about 800 times, as the spacecraft is exposed to an anticipated 20 million rads of radiation It does not stop all radiation, but significantly reduces it in order to limit damage to the spacecraft's electronics.

== Summary ==
The vault has been compared being like "armor" or like a "tank", and the electronics within, like the spacecraft's "brain". The power systems have been described as a "heart".

Without its protective shield, or radiation vault, Juno’s brain would get fried on the very first pass near Jupiter

— Juno's PI

The vault is one of many features of the mission to help counter the high radiation levels near Jupiter, including an orbit that reduces time spent in the highest radiation regions, radiation-hardened electronics, and additional shielding on components. The wires that lead out from the vault also have increased protection, they have a sheath of braided copper and stainless steel. Some other components used tantalum metal for shielding in Juno, and while lead is known for its shielding effect it was found to be too soft in this application. One reason that titanium was chosen over lead in this application was because titanium was better at handling launch stresses.

Another shield part of the spacecraft is the Stellar Reference Unit (SRU), which has six times the shielding to prevent static forming on images due to radiation. Juno is a space probe sent to Jupiter in 2011 and it entered orbit the night of July 4, 2016. Juno is part of the New Frontiers program of NASA and was also built with some contributions by the Italian Space Agency (ASI). After arriving at Jupiter in July 2016, the mission went into a 53-day orbit around the planet, and collected data using its suite of instrumentation in the late 2010s.

== Inside the vault ==
There are at least 20 different electronics boxes inside the vault, which is intended to reduce the amount of radiation they receive.

Examples of components inside the vault:

- Command and data handling box
- RAD750 microprocessor
- Power and data distribution unit
- Thermistor temperature sensors
- UVS instrument electronics box
- Waves instrument receivers and electronics box
- Microwave Radiometer electronics
- JADE instrument Ebox (or E-Box)
  - Low-Voltage Power Supply Module
  - Instrument Processing Board
  - Sensor Interface Board
  - High-Voltage Power Supplies (two)

JEDI and JunoCam do not have electronic boxes inside the vault.

== Technological relations ==
A Ganymede orbiter proposal also included a design for a Juno-like radiation vault. However, because the radiation is less at Jupiter's moon Ganymede and the orbiter's path, the vault would not have to be as thick, all else being similar. One reason the radiation is strong at Jupiter, but confined to certain belts, is because it is generated by ions and electrons trapped in areas as a result of Jupiter's magnetic field. Jupiter's magnetosphere is about 20,000 times as strong as Earth's and is one of the items of study by Juno. (see also Juno's Magnetometer (MAG) instrument)

Another spacecraft with radiation shields was Skylab, which needed a radiation shield over a borosilicate glass window to stop it darkening, and several film vaults. There were five vaults for photographic film aboard the Skylab space station, and the largest weighed 1088 kg (2398 lb). Juno is the spacecraft with a titanium vault for its electronics, however. Radiation hardening in general is an important part of spacecraft design when it is required, and the main processor of Juno, the RAD750, has been used on other spacecraft where there are elevated radiation levels, and it is a radiation-hardened microprocessor. For example, the RAD750 was also used on the Curiosity rover, launched November 26, 2011

It was suggested by the publication Popular Science that the Europa Lander may use a radiation vault like the Juno Jupiter orbiter.

== Radiation infographic ==
Infographic on radiation at Jupiter

== See also ==
- Galileo (spacecraft), NASA space probe to Jupiter 1989–2003 also endured high radiation
- Van Allen radiation belt (Earth's radiation belt)
- Europa Clipper (the next Jupiter mission under study during the 2010s)
- Radiation protection
