= VVS =

VVS may refer to:

== Groups, companies, organizations ==
- Verkehrs- und Tarifverbund Stuttgart, the regional transport authority of the Stuttgart region, Germany
- Flemish Union of Students (Vlaamse Vereniging van Studenten), the national union of students in Flanders
- Netherlands Society for Statistics and Operations Research (Dutch: Vereniging voor Statistiek en Operationele Research; VVS)
- Vereniging Voor Sterrenkunde, the Flemish society of amateur astronomers; see SKEPP
- Videoville Showtime, a Canadian motion picture distribution company
- Vy Vato Sakelika, a Malgasy nationalist secret society

== Military ==
- Voenno-Vozdushnye Sily (Russian: Военно-воздушные силы), or VVS, translates to "Air Force"
  - Soviet Air Forces (1918–1992)
  - Russian Air Force (1991 onwards), the aerial warfare service branch of the Armed Forces of the Russian Federation
  - Belarusian Air Force (1995 onwards, in particular), the air force of the Armed Forces of Belarus
  - Bulgarian Air Force, a branch of the Military of Bulgaria

== Arts, entertainment, media ==
- Vid Vintergatans slut, a Swedish TV series
- Varuthapadatha Valibar Sangam, a 2013 Tamil film
- VVS (album), 2018 album by Ufo361
- "VVS" (song), 2020 song by Mirani, Munchman, Khundi Panda, and Mushvenom
- "VVS", 2021 song by Ninho from Jefe
- "VVS", 2023 song by Peso Pluma from Génesis
- VVS (group), a South Korean girl group formed in 2025

== People ==
- VVS Laxman (born 1974), Indian cricketer
- VVS Murari, Indian composer, violist

== Places ==
=== Schools ===
- Vasant Valley School, an Indian school in New Delhi
- Vernon-Verona-Sherrill High School, an American high school in Verona, New York
- Visakha Valley School, an Indian school in Visakhapatnam

== Medicine ==
- Vulvar vestibulitis syndrome, a syndrome of vulvodynia associated with chronic disease
- Vasovagal syncope

== Other uses ==
- Very Very Slightly included, a grading measure on various scales for diamond clarity
- Varme-, ventilasjons- og sanitærteknikk (heating, ventilation and cleaning technology in Norwegian).

== See also ==
- BBC (disambiguation)
- UUS (disambiguation)
- VUS (disambiguation)
- UVS (disambiguation)
- WS (disambiguation)
- VS (disambiguation)
- VV (disambiguation), for the singular of "VVs"
