= Ralph (New Horizons) =

Science instrument on New Horizons spacecraft

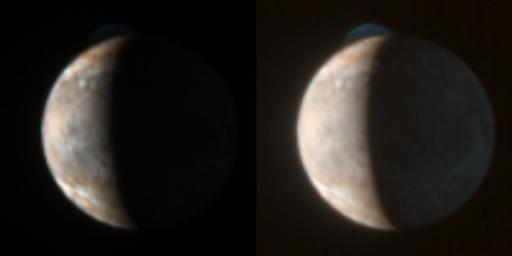
Ralph's MVIC-channel image of Jupiter's moon Io

In astronautics and astronomy, Ralph is a scientific instrument aboard the New Horizons, a NASA spacecraft launched in 2006. Ralph is an image sensor and spectrometer, sensitive to electromagnetic radiation in the visible light and infrared range, and is used to generate images of astronomical objects (astrophotography). Ralph has two major subinstruments, LEISA and MVIC. MVIC stands for Multispectral Visible Imaging Camera and is a color imaging device, while LEISA originally stood for Linear Etalon Imaging Spectral Array and is an infrared imaging spectrometer for spaceflight. LEISA observes 250 discrete wavelengths of infrared light from 1.25 to 2.5 micrometers. MVIC is a pushbroom scanner type of design with seven channels, including red, blue, near-infrared (NIR), and methane.

== Overview ==
Ralph is one of seven major instruments aboard New Horizons which was launched in 2006 and flew by the dwarf planet Pluto in 2015.

At Pluto, Ralph enables the observation of many aspects including:

- geology of Pluto
- form
- structure
- surface composition
- surface temperature

Ralph and Alice were used to characterize the atmosphere of Pluto in 2015. Ralph was previously used to observe the planet Jupiter and its moons in 2006 and in 2007 when it flew-by en route out of the Solar System and past Pluto. Observations of Jupiter were taken with Ralph in February 2007, when New Horizons was about 6 million kilometers (nearly 4 million miles) from the giant.

Ralph took color images of Arrokoth during the New Horizons flyby on January 1, 2019. Ralph, in conjunction with the LORRI telescope, was used to make a digital elevation map of the body.

A version of Ralph is carried on Lucy, which is visiting six Jupiter trojans and an asteroid in the 2020s. The developers of that spacecraft noted in particular Ralph's ability to observe visible and infrared light by splitting the light stream, and then analyze two spectrums of light at the same time.

== Naming ==
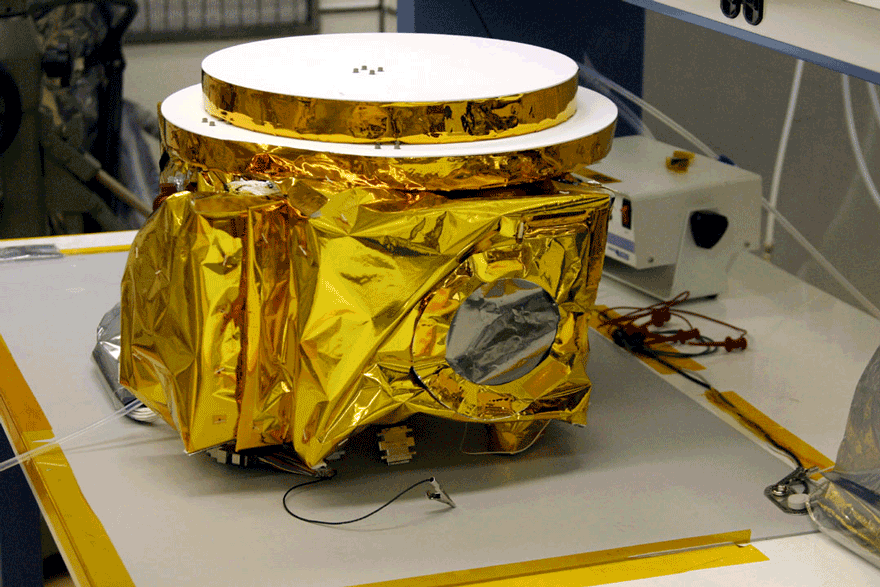
Ralph

Ralph is named after a character in the 1950s television show The Honeymooners, along with another New Horizons instrument, Alice.

LEISA's acronym was retitled from Linear Etalon Imaging Spectral Array to Lisa Hardaway Infrared Mapping Spectrometer by NASA in June 2017, after Ralph's program manager. Lisa Hardaway was an aerospace engineer and New Horizons Ralph instrument program manager who died in January 2017 at the age of 50. Hardaway was honored with Engineer of the Year for 2015–2016 by the American Institute of Aeronautics and Astronautics (Rocky Mountain Section) and Women in Aerospace organization awarded her a leadership award in 2015. In the summer of 2017, NASA renamed the LEISA channel in her honor.

Lisa made incredible contributions to New Horizons and our success in exploring Pluto, and we wanted to celebrate those contributions in a special way by dedicating the LEISA spectrometer in her honor.

— New Horizons principal investigator

== Methane observations ==
An example of Ralph's abilities is shown by this detection of methane on the surface of Pluto (left), overlaid on an image from LORRI on the right:

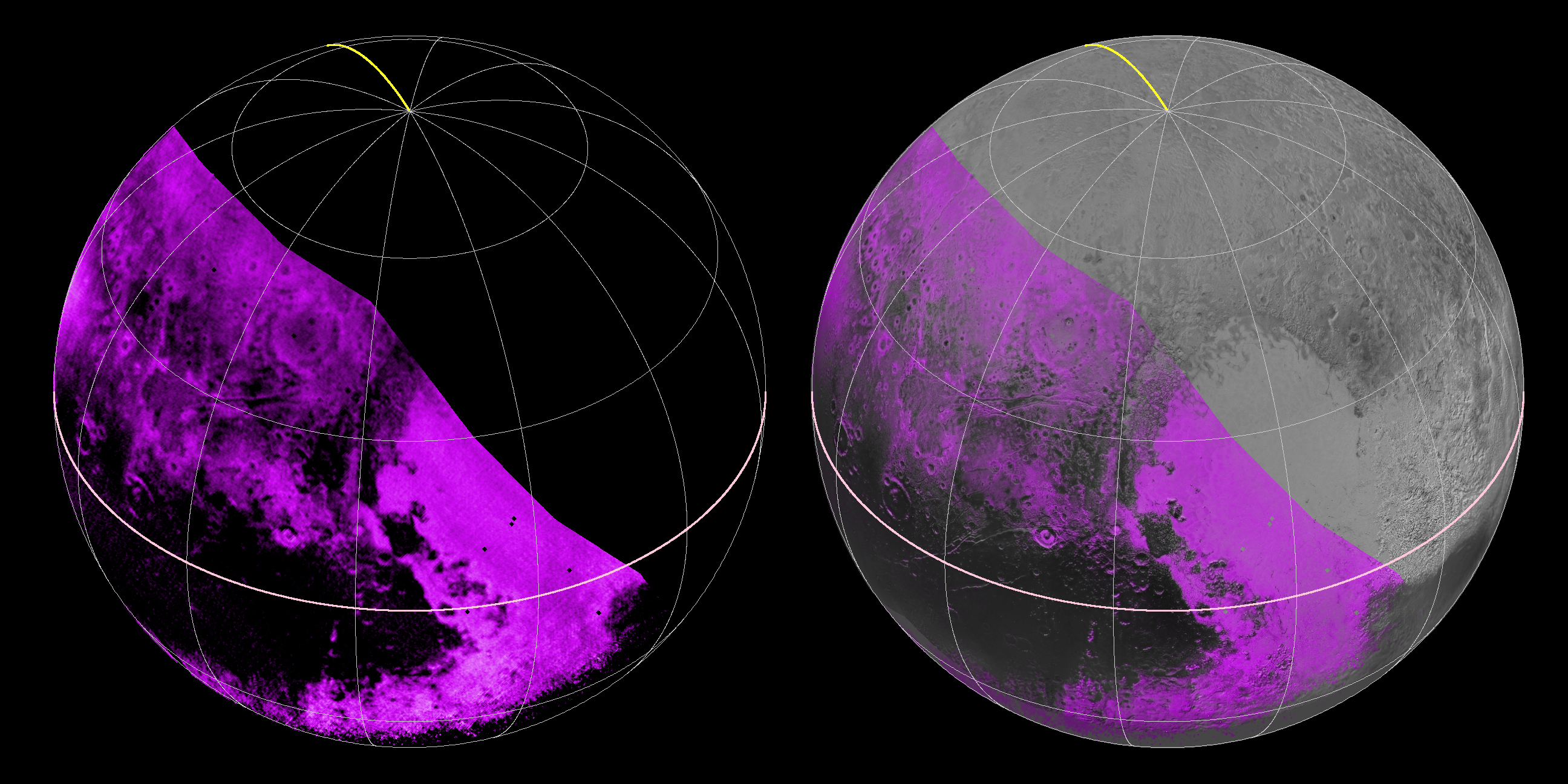
Ralph methane detections (left) overlaid onto a LORRI image of dwarf planet Pluto (right)

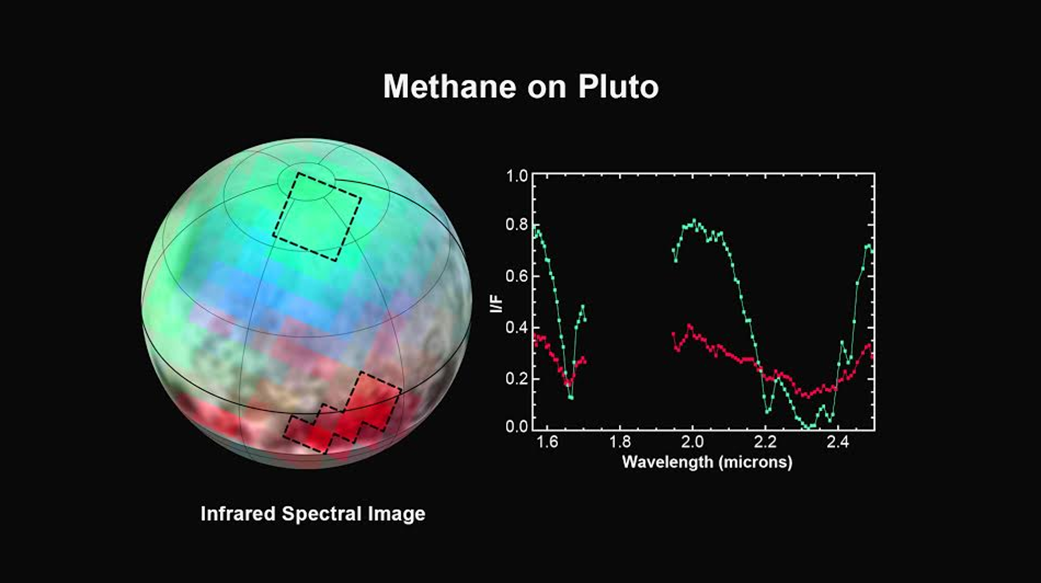
LEISA channel data, showing its lower definition infrared image of Pluto but with recorded infrared spectra of the dwarf planet in false color. Two infrared spectra are shown, from the outlined regions in the global map to the left. 1 Micron is 1000 nm, and visible light is below 1 Micron.

In 2018 it was announced, based on New Horizons high resolution data, that some of the plains of Pluto have dunes made of methane ice granules. The dunes are thought to have been formed by the blowing winds of Pluto, which are not as dense as those of Earth, and were compared to Dunes elsewhere in the Solar System such as on Saturn's moon Titan.

== Specifications ==
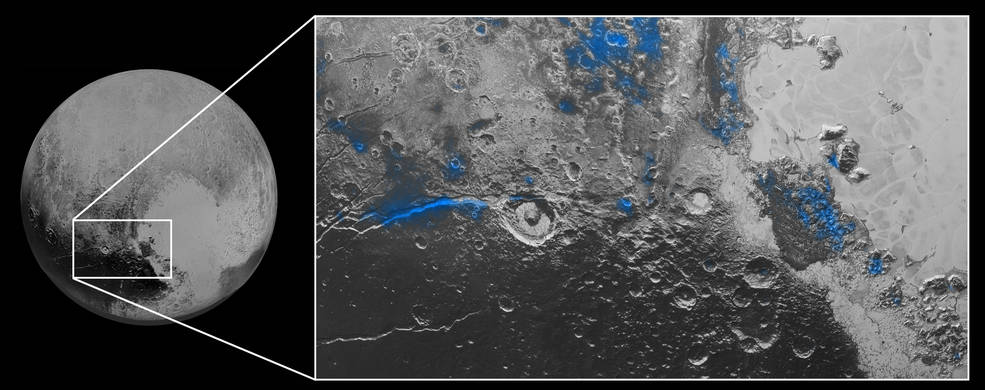
Water ice identified on Pluto with Ralph spectral signatures of water ice from LEISA noted in blue on top of MVIC imaging

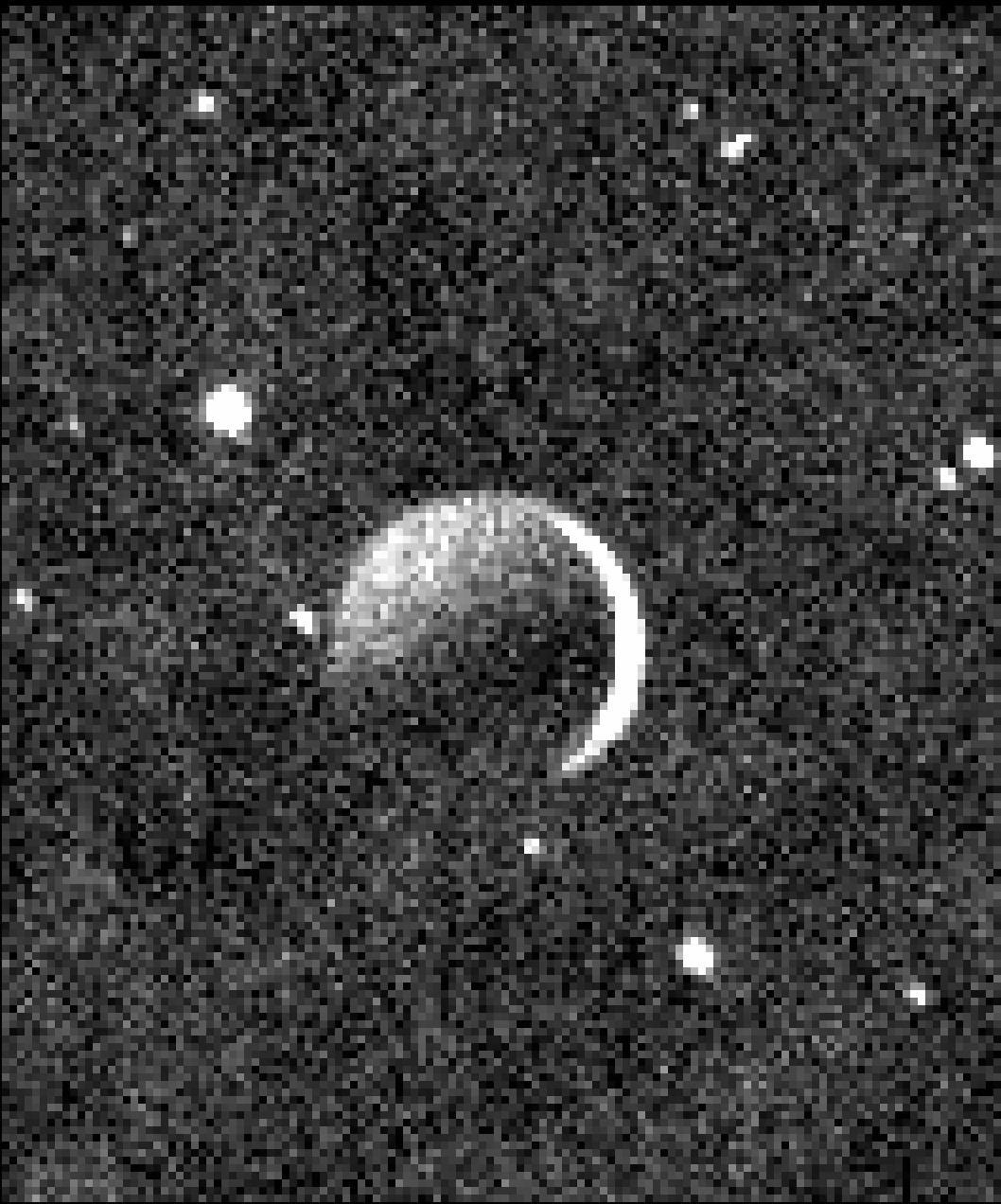
This extremely low-light image is a view of the dark side of Pluto's moon Charon, lit by starlight and Plutoshine. Ralph-MVIC channel data

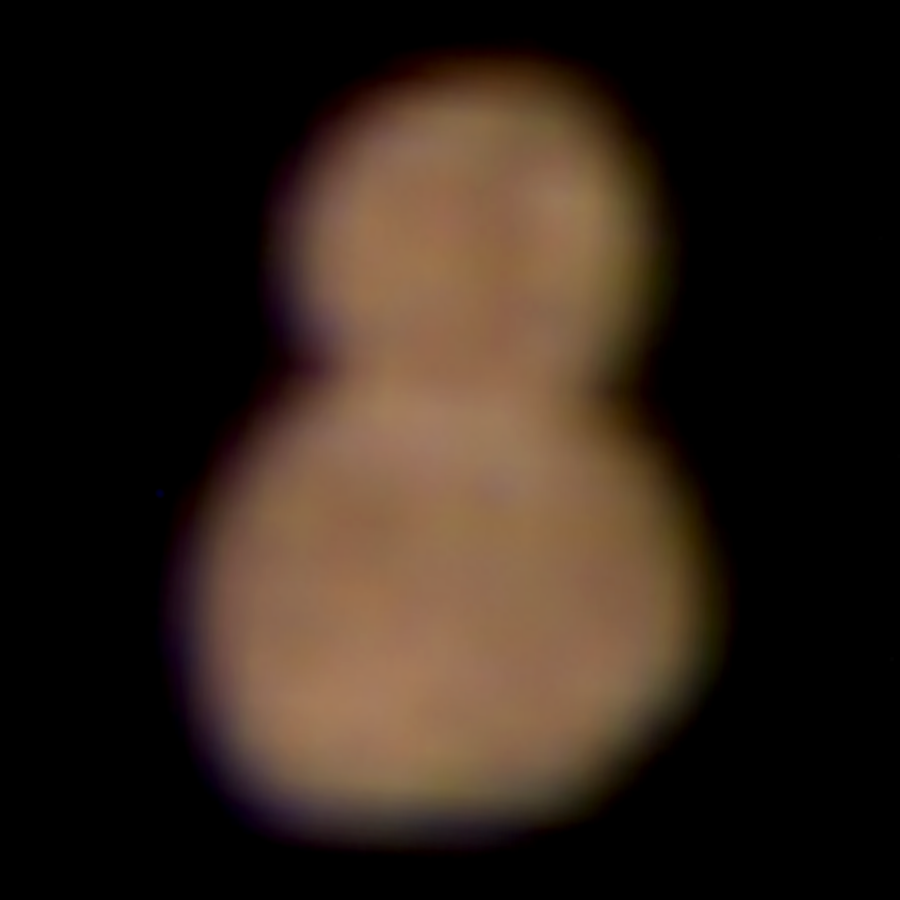
Arrokoth image taken by Ralph-MVIC (January 2, 2019 release)

Specifications:

- Mass: 10.5 kilograms (23 lb)
- Max power use: 7.1 watts
- Telescope design
  - Unobscured
  - Off-axis
  - Three-mirror anastigmat
- Aperture 75 mm
  - f/8.7
  - Effective focal length 658 mm
- Electronic control boards
  - Detector electronics (DE)
  - Command and data handling (C&DH)
  - Low voltage power supply (LVPS)

The one telescope feeds light to both LEISA and MVIC channels, with light split by a dichroic beamsplitter.

- MVIC detects light between 400 and 975 nm wavelengths
- LEISA detects light between 1250 and 2500 nm wavelengths

MVIC has seven CCDs that are wide but short, utilizing time-delay integration to read the imaging area. These channels have a resolution of 5024×32 pixels, with the larger direction providing the swath of the image. There are seven channels, with 6 used for time delay integration imaging and the seventh with an array of 5024×128 for navigation framing. MVIC has a field of view that is 5.8 degrees wide The framing channel, with 5024×128 pixel size, is panchromatic and a field of view of 5.7 degrees × 0.15 degrees. Unlike the other six channels, it can stare at one target and take an image. The purpose of this channel is to support optical navigation. The Navigation channel is a Frame array that operates as a single frame, rather than the other channels which generate an image by time delay integration.

MVIC Bands: There are six channels that use Time Delay Integration and another that takes a frame and is for navigation.

- 2 panchromatic channels (observing light wavelengths from 400 to 975 nm)
- Blue (400–550 nm)
- Red (540–700 nm)
- Near infrared (from 780 up to 975 nm light wavelengths)
- methane band (860–910 nm)
- Navigation channel / framing array

LEISA achieved its highest resolution data of Pluto of about 3 km/pixel at New Horizon's closest approach to Pluto on July 14, 2015, when it was 47,000 km distant.

== Images ==
During the flyby of Pluto on July 14, 2015, Ralph was able to collect data on Pluto and its moons yielding various image results. In addition, the MVIC color channels were often the source of color on the otherwise panchromatic LORRI images.

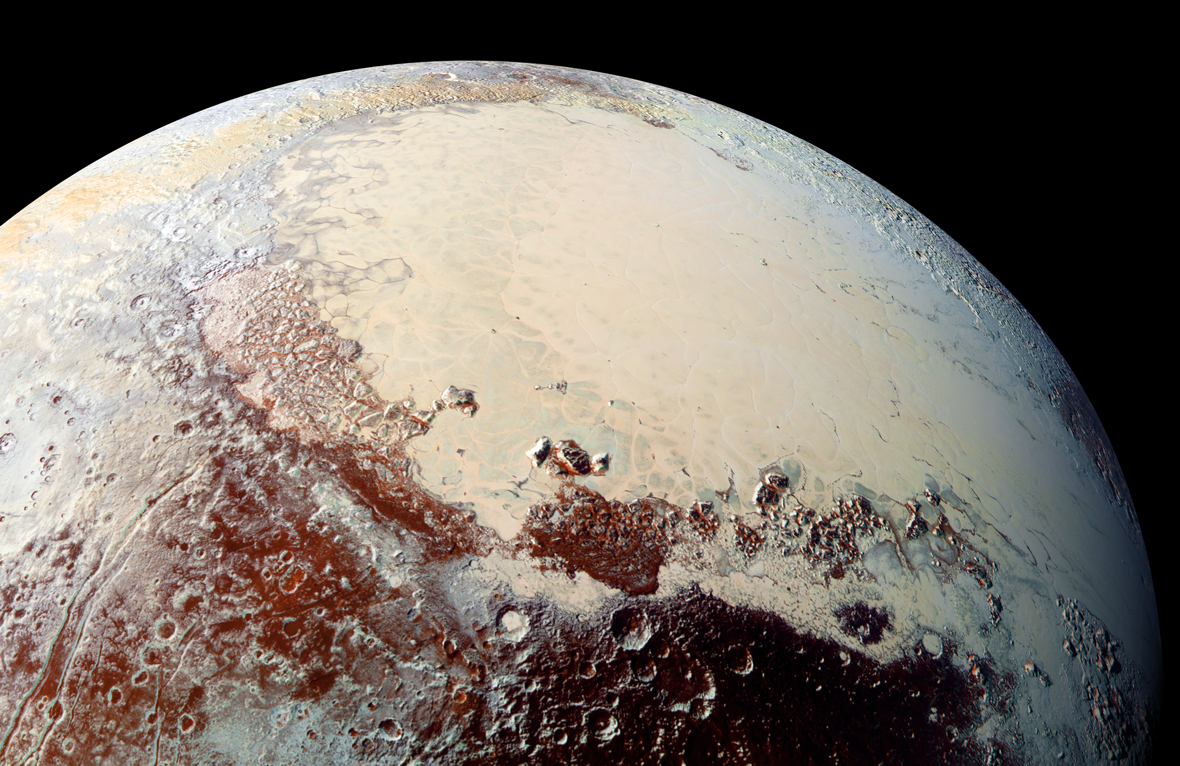
This image of Pluto from July 2015 flyby includes Ralph-MVIC red, blue, and NIR color data.

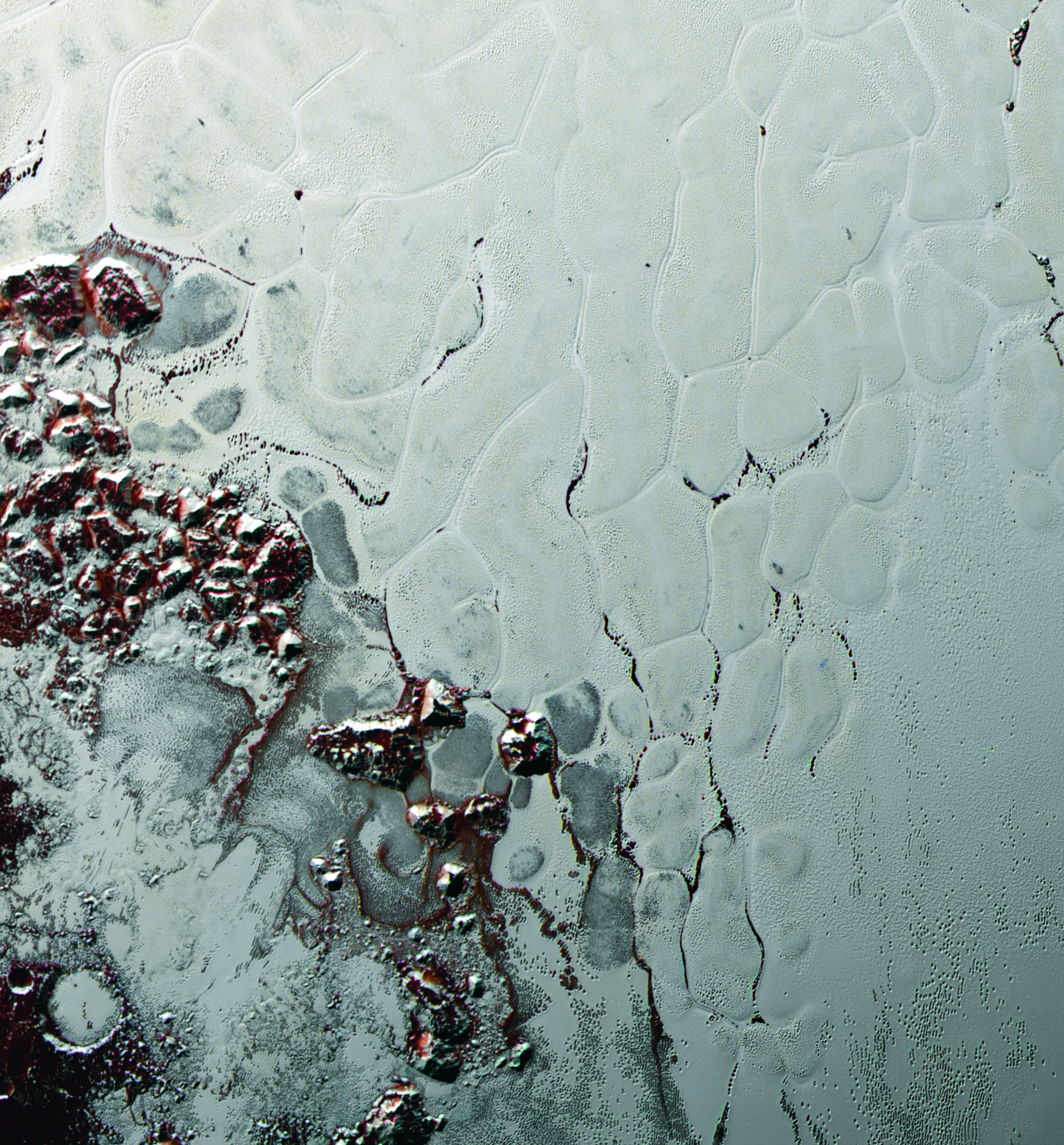
Ralph-MVIC view's a 250 miles (400 kilometers) section of Pluto on July 14, 2015

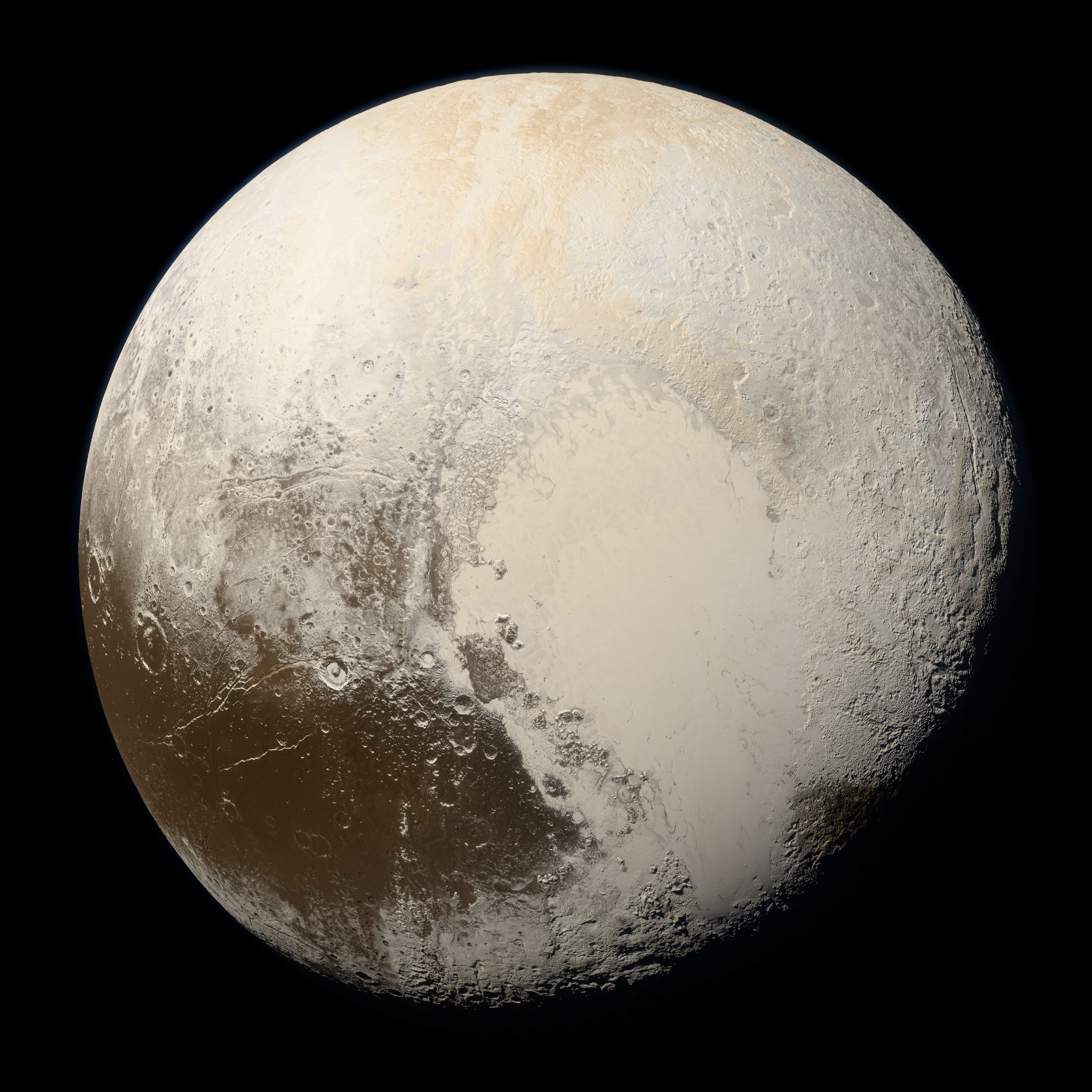
Attempted natural color view using only data from MVIC channel

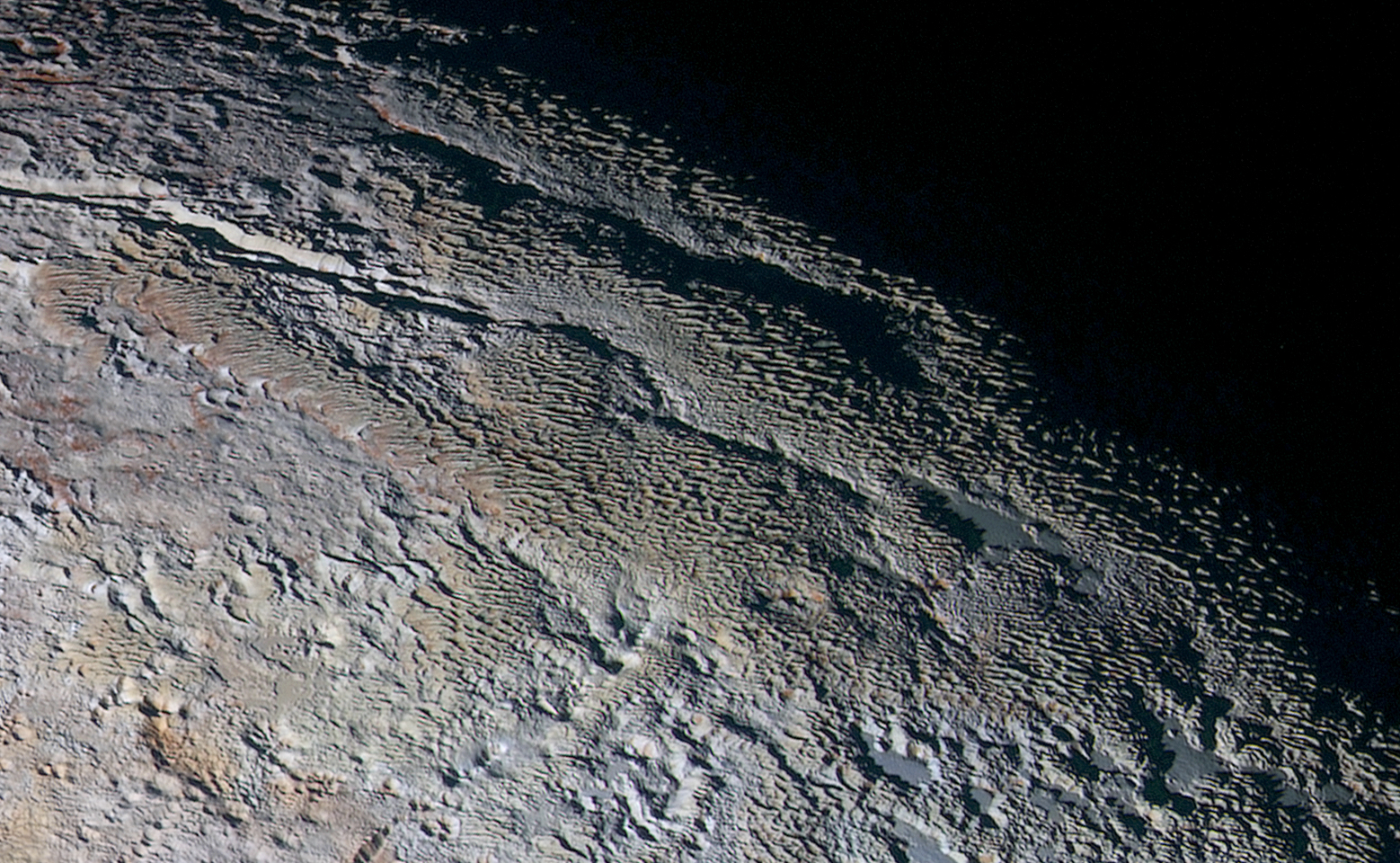
An example of an image from LORRI, a view of Pluto's terrain from its 2015 flyby of the dwarf planet with Ralph-MVIC data from Red, Blue, and Near IR channels. This image is about 330 miles (530 kilometers) across

=== 486958 Arrokoth ===
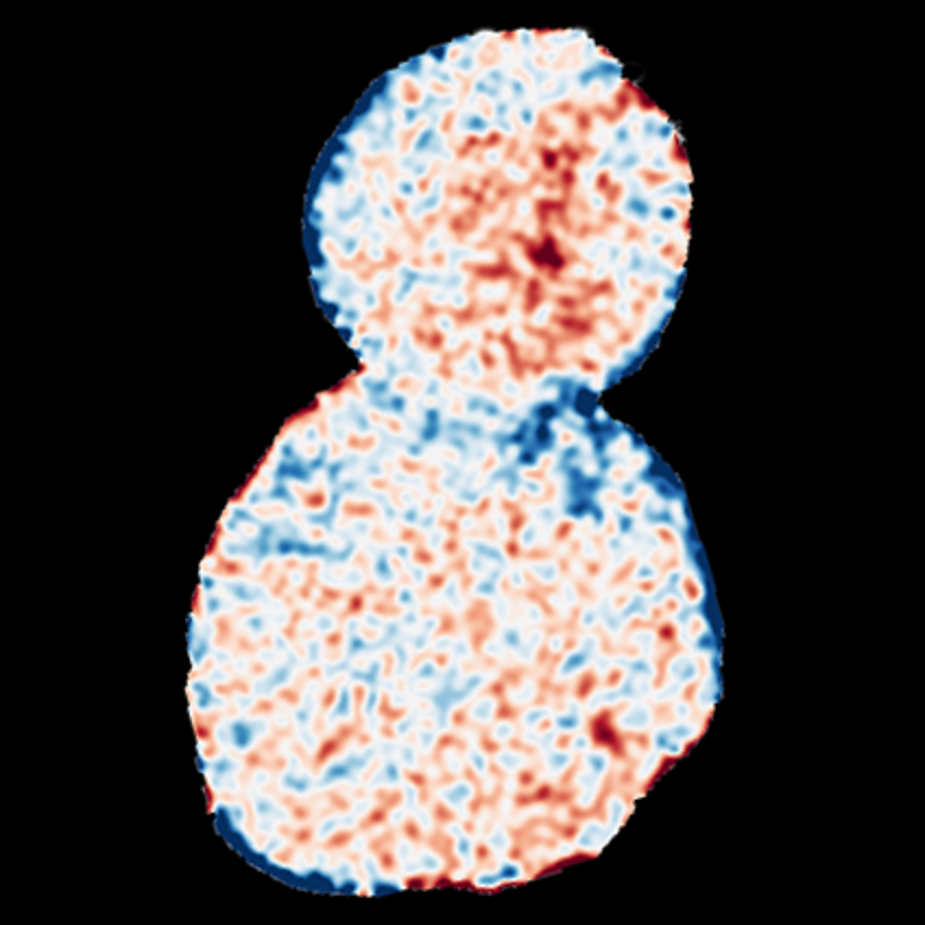
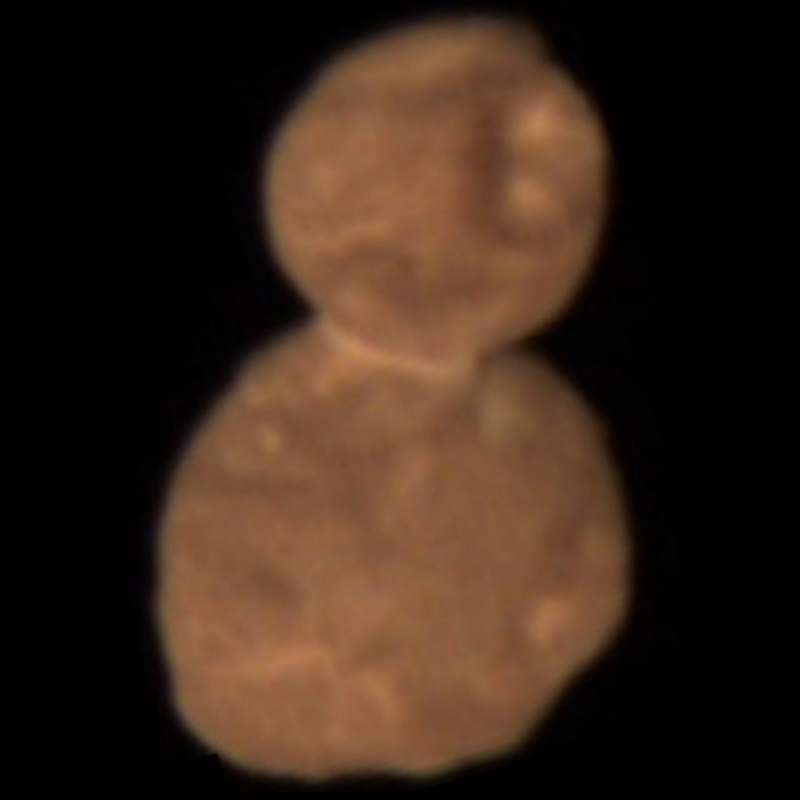
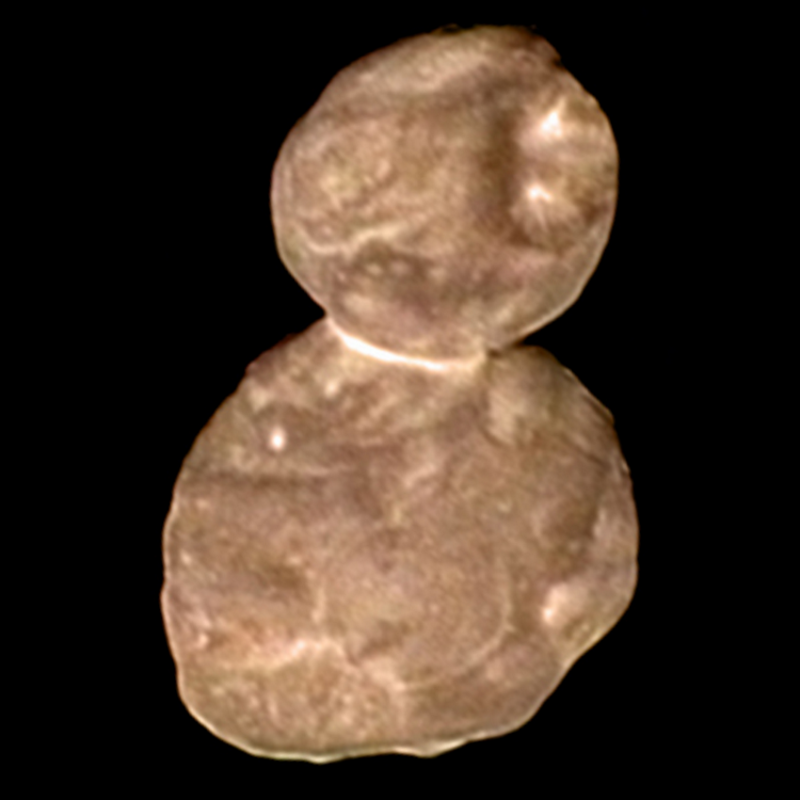
Ralph-MVIC color and spectral images of Arrokoth, showing subtle color variations across its surface. The image on the right is the same MVIC color image superimposed on the higher resolution black and white LORRI image. (Note: Composite of black and while and color photographs taken respectively by the LORRI and MVIC instruments aboard New Horizons on 1 January 2019.)

== See also ==
- UVS (Ultraviolet imaging spectrometer on Juno Jupiter orbiter)
- Jovian Infrared Auroral Mapper (Infrared imaging on Juno orbiter)
- Compact Reconnaissance Imaging Spectrometer for Mars (CRISM, an imaging spectrometer in Mars orbit)
- List of New Horizons topics
