= Uvs (disambiguation) =

Uvs is a province in Mongolia.

Uvs or UVS may also refer to:

- Europa Ultraviolet Spectrograph
- UVS (Juno)
- Uvs Lake, in Mongolia and Russia
- Uvs Lake Basin, in Mongolia and Russia
