= Jovian Infrared Auroral Mapper =

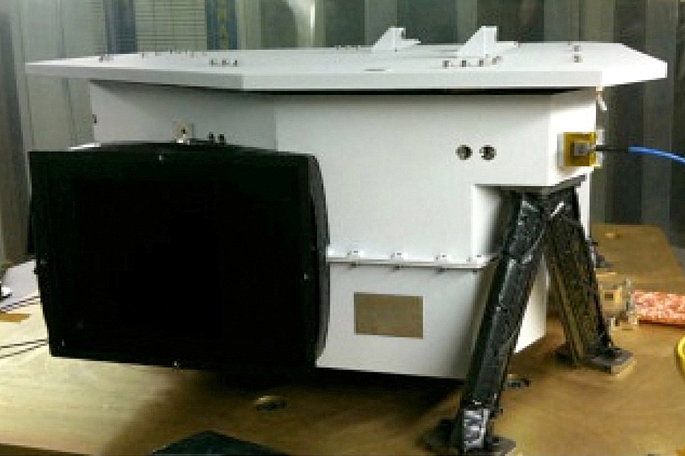
JIRAM

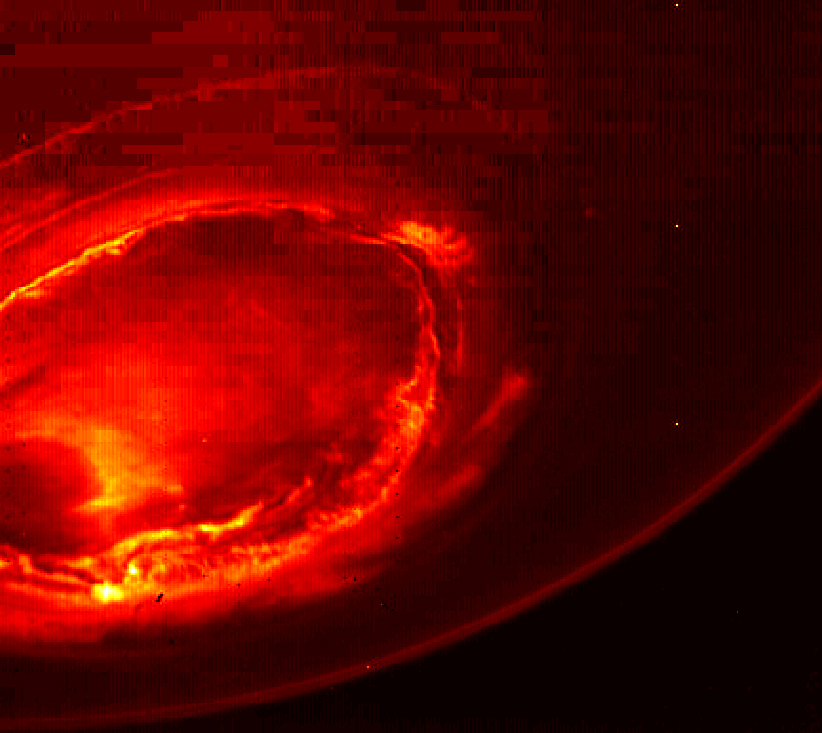
JIRAM data on Jupiter's southern lights, August 2016

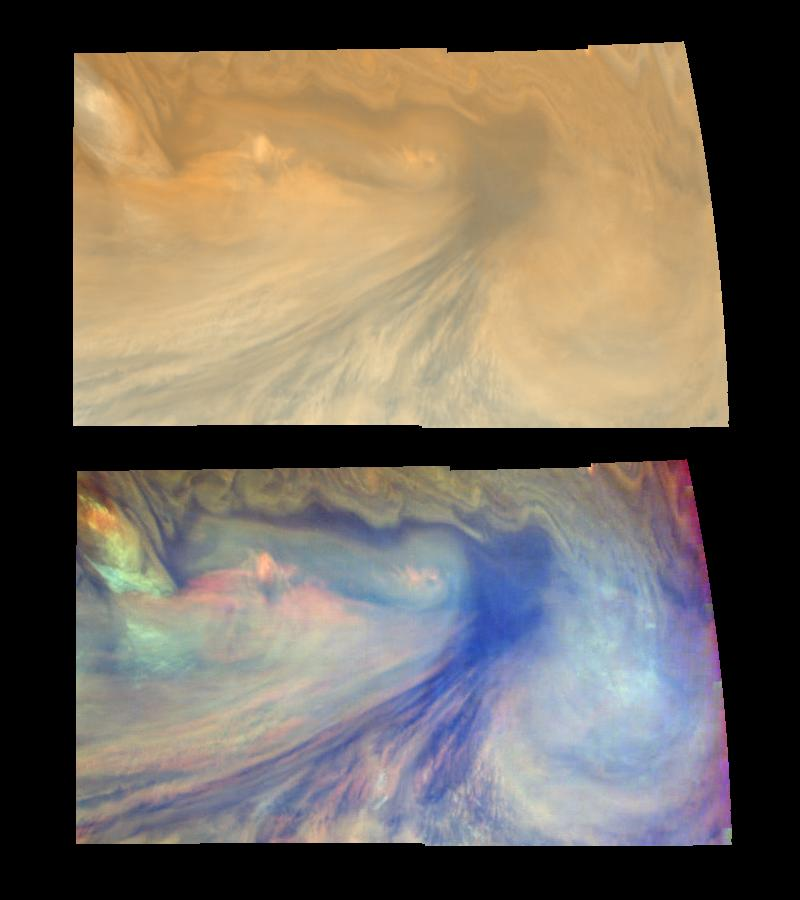
Jovian "Hotspot" in visible (top) and near infrared (bottom) from a previous mission.

Jovian Infrared Auroral Mapper (JIRAM) is an instrument on the Juno spacecraft in orbit of the planet Jupiter. It is an image spectrometer and was contributed by Italy. Similar instruments are on ESA Rosetta, Venus Express, and Cassini-Huygens missions. The primary goal of JIRAM is to probe the upper layers of Jupiter's atmosphere down to pressures of 5–7 bars (72–102 pound/square inch) at infrared wavelengths in the 2–5 μm interval using an imager and a spectrometer. The Jupiter's atmosphere and auroral regions are targeted for study. In particular it has been designed to study the dynamics and chemistry in the atmosphere, perhaps determining the how Jovian hot spots form.

H^{+}_{3} ions, ammonia, and phosphine can be mapped by taking images and spectra at the appropriate wavelengths of light. The trihydrogen cation, H^{+}_{3}, is rare on Earth, but is one of the most common ions in the universe due to its quick production via neutral hydrogen (H_{2}) ionization---it is also known as protonated molecular hydrogen.

Because the space environment around Jupiter is heavily irradiated, the JIRAM instrument was expected to be operational for at least the first eight orbits; it has remained operational through over 50 orbits.

Previously Jupiter was observed by an Infrared imaging spectrometer called NIMS (Near-Infrared Mapping Spectrometer) on the Galileo Jupiter orbiter. JIRAM was used to observe Earth during its flyby en route to Jupiter. These observations were used to help calibrate the instrument, and the lunar observations were actually a critical planned step in preparing the instrument for observations at Jupiter. The polar orbit of the Juno mission permits to get unprecedented observations of the planet. In particular, the polar regions, that where never observed before Juno, can be observed with high spatial resolution.

On August 27, 2016, JIRAM observed Jupiter at infrared wavelengths. The first science observation in space was conducted on Earth's Moon in October 2013.

The JIRAM project was started by Professor Angioletta Coradini, however she died in 2011. The instrument was developed from Leonardo under the directions and supervision of the Institute for Space Astrophysics and Planetogy (IAPS) which is part of the Italian National Institute for Astrophysics and was funded by the Italian Space Agency. Dr. Alberto Adriani of IAPS is presently the responsible of the JIRAM project.

In March 2018, results from JIRAM were released showing both the North and south poles have a central cyclone surrounded by addition cyclones. The north cycle was surrounded by 8 cyclones, while the southern cyclone was surrounded by five. By this time Juno had completed 10 close passes for science observations, since arriving in Jupiter's orbit on July 4, 2016. The first science pass occurred on August 28, 2016, and JIRAM was operated during that pass.

Various results, including a 3D movie a flyover of the north pole of Jupiter with JIRAM data were released at the European Geosciences Union General Assembly in April 2018.

JIRAM's spin-compensation mirror has been stuck since PJ44, but the instrument is operational.

== Specifications ==
- Mass: 8 kg (17.6 pounds)
- Max power use: 16.7 watts
- Observation range: 2–5 micron wavelength light

== Observations ==
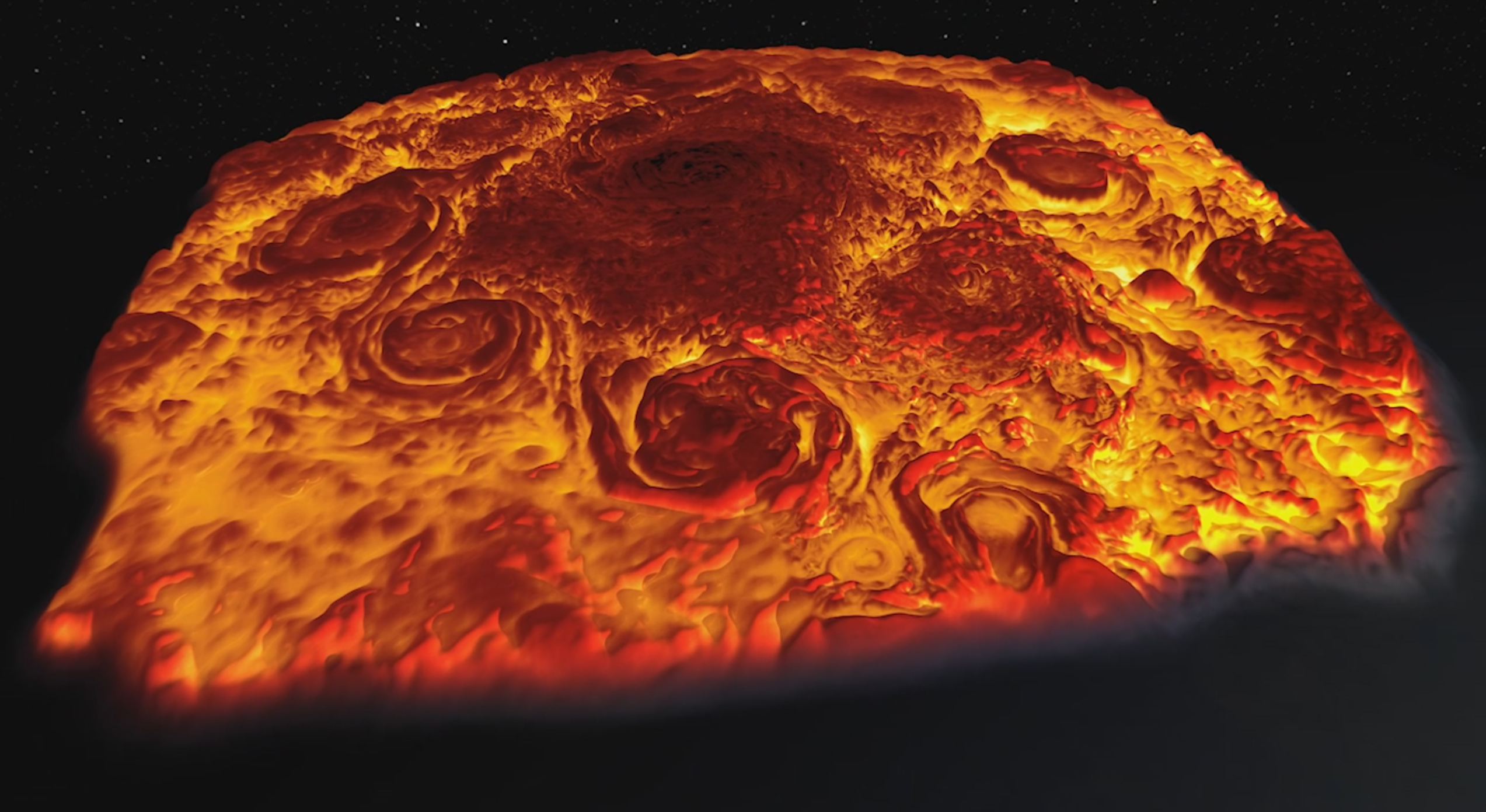
Using data from JIRAM, a computer-generated view of Jupiter's north pole

== See also ==
- Gravity Science
- Jovian Auroral Distributions Experiment (JADE)
- JunoCam
- Magnetometer (Juno) (MAG)
- Mapping Imaging Spectrometer for Europa
- Microwave Radiometer (Juno)
- MIRI (Mid-Infrared Instrument) (Infrared imaging spectrometer on JWST)
- Ralph (New Horizons), imaging spectrometer on New Horizons, Pluto flyby probe
- UVS (Juno) (Imaging spectrometer on Juno for ultraviolet light)
- Atmosphere of Jupiter
