= Geocorona =

Luminous part of the outermost region of the Earth's atmosphere

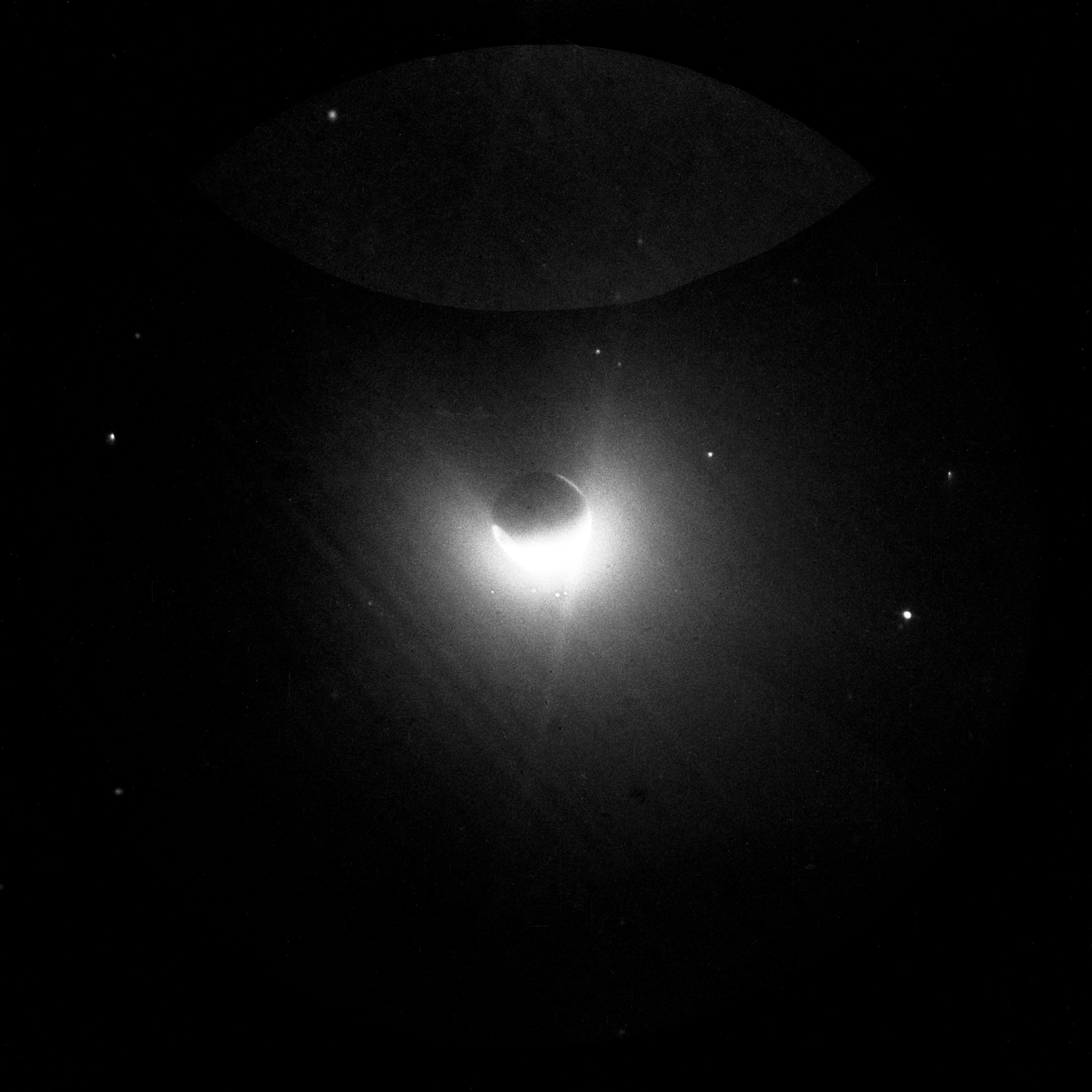
Ultraviolet image of Earth and the geocorona taken in 1972 with a camera operated by Apollo 16 astronauts on the Moon

False color Lyman-alpha image of the geocorona stacked from 5,790 exposures taken by the Carruthers Geocorona Observatory from near the Sun–Earth L1 point between November 2025 – October 2026. The Moon's positions during its February 2026 transit and the background stars are drawn from measurements and star catalogs.

The geocorona is the luminous part of the outermost region of the Earth's atmosphere, called the exosphere. It is seen primarily via far-ultraviolet light (Lyman-alpha) from the Sun that is scattered from neutral hydrogen. It extends to at minimum 15.5 Earth radii and probably up to about 100 Earth radii (for context, the Moon is approx. 60 Earth radii away). The geocorona has been studied from outer space by the Astrid satellites and the Galileo spacecraft (among others), using its ultraviolet spectrometer (UVS) during an Earth flyby.

== See also ==
- Stellar corona
- Atmosphere of Earth
- Carruthers Geocorona Observatory, a NASA mission to study geocorona
