= Alice (spacecraft instrument) =

Ultraviolet imaging spectrometer aboard New Horizons and Rosetta

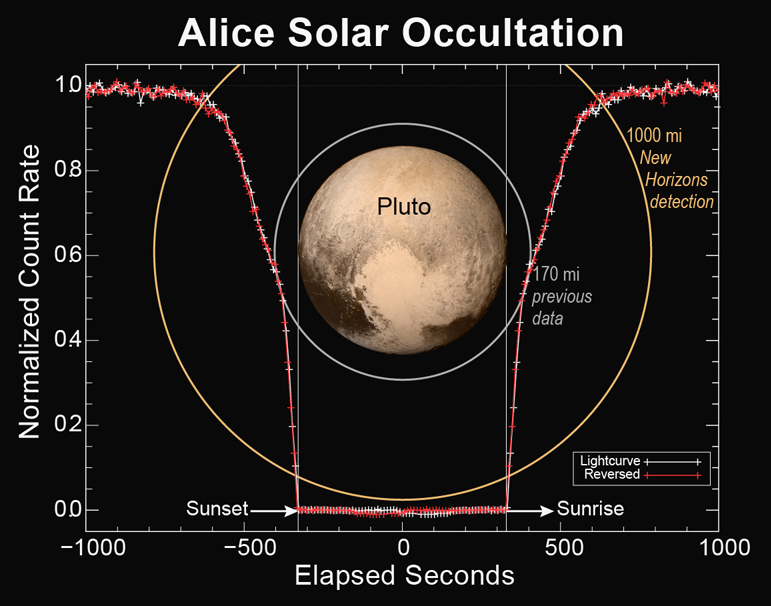
Infrographic of Alice data from its 2015 encounter with Pluto on New Horizons

Alice is any one of two ultraviolet imaging spectrometers; one used on the New Horizons spacecraft and the other used on the Rosetta spacecraft. Alice is a small telescope with a spectrograph and a special detector with 32 pixels each with 1024 spectral channels detecting ultraviolet light. Its primary role is to determine the relative concentrations of various elements and isotopes in Pluto's atmosphere.

Alice has an off-axis telescope which sends light to a Rowland-circle spectrograph, and the instrument has a field of view of 6 degrees. It is designed to capture airglow and solar occultation at the same time, and has two inputs to allow this.

== Overview ==
Alice uses an array of potassium bromide and caesium iodide type of photocathodes. It detects in the extreme and far ultraviolet spectrum, from 700–2,050 Å (70–205 nm) wavelengths of light, with a spectral resolution of 8–12 Å (0.80–1.20 nm) and a spatial resolution of 500 metres (1,600 feet) per 50 km (31 miles) of altitude.

Alice is intended, among its capabilities, to detect ultraviolet signatures of noble (a.k.a. inert) gases including helium, neon, argon, and krypton. Alice should also be able to detect water, carbon monoxide, and carbon dioxide in the ultraviolet. Although the instrument was designed to study Pluto's atmosphere, ALICE will also be tasked with studying Pluto's moon Charon, in addition to various Kuiper-belt objects.

ALICE was built and operated by the Southwest Research Institute for NASA's Jet Propulsion Laboratory. The instrument is powered using a radiation hardened version of an Intel 8052 micro-processor. The instrument uses 32KB of programmable read only memory (PROM), 128 KB of EEPROM, and 32KB of SRAM. The command and data handling electronics are contained across four circuit boards which sit behind the detectors.

ALICE operates in two separate data modes; Pixel List mode (PLM) and Histogram mode (HM). In Pixel List mode, the number of photons/second are recorded. In Histogram mode, the sensor array collects data/photons for a defined period of time. This data is then read as a 2D image. Furthermore, whilst the image is being read from the first memory bank, a second exposure can be started using the secondary memory bank. An advantage of utilising two different data modes is that the method of data collection can be tailored to the scientific goals. PLM provides time resolution, where as HM consistently requires same amount of memory, regardless of exposure length.

== Naming ==
Alice is not an acronym. The name was chosen by principal investigator Alan Stern for personal reasons.

== Alice on New Horizons ==
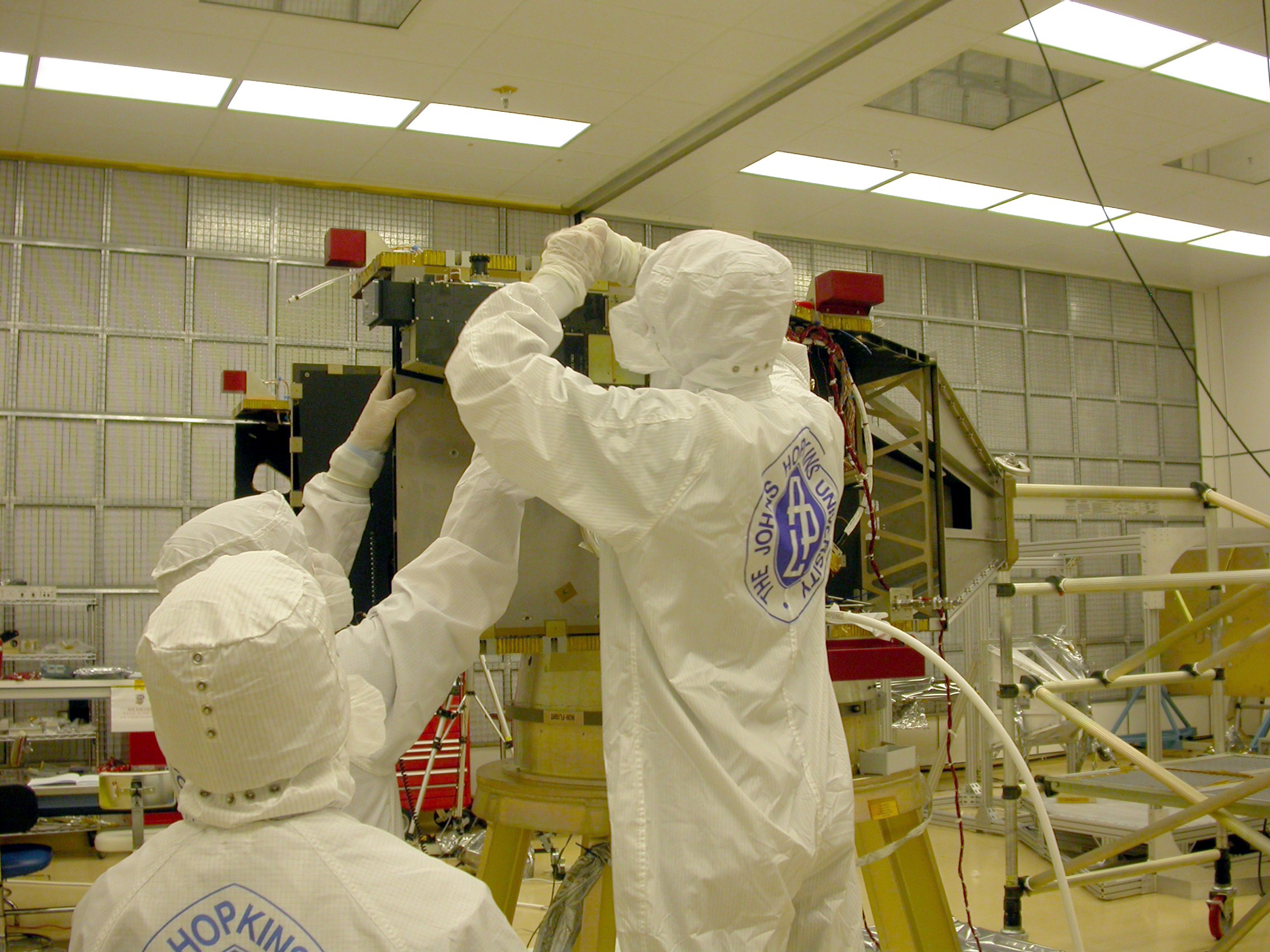
Alice installed on New Horizons spacecraft

In August 2018, NASA confirmed, based on results by Alice on the New Horizons spacecraft, the detection of a "hydrogen wall" at the outer edges of the Solar System that was first detected in 1992 by the two Voyager spacecraft which have detected a surplus of ultraviolet light determined to be coming from hydrogen.

The New Horizons version of Alice uses an average power of 4.4 watts and weighs 4.5 kg (9.9 pounds).

Examples
Name	Wavelength Bandpass	Aperture(s)
Human eye	400–700 nm (approx.)	0.6 cm
LORRI	350 – 850 nm	20.8 cm
Alice	70-205 nm	(two; 40 x 40 mm^{2} 1 mm

== Alice on Rosetta ==
On Rosetta, a mission to a comet, Alice performed ultraviolet spectroscopy to search and quantify the noble gas content in the comet nucleus.

On Rosetta it is a 3.1 kg (6.8 lb) instrument which uses 2.9 watts.

== See also ==
- UVS (Juno) (ultraviolet imaging spectrometer on Juno Jupiter orbiter)
- Ultraviolet–visible spectroscopy
- List of New Horizons topics
