= Angioletta Coradini =

Italian astrophysicist and planetary scientist

- Born: 1 July 1946; Rovereto, Italy
- Died: 5 September 2011 (aged 65); Rome, Italy
- Spouse: Costanzo Federico
- Scientific career
- Fields: Astrophysics, planetology, geophysics
- Workplaces: Università degli Studi di Roma "La Sapienza"; Consiglio Nazionale delle Ricerche; Istituto Nazionale di Astrofisica
- Doctoral advisor: Marcello Fulchignoni

Angioletta Coradini (1 July 1946 – 4 September 2011) was an Italian astrophysicist and planetary scientist.

== Biography ==
In 1970 she completed a master's degree in physics at the University of Rome "La Sapienza" - the city where she would do her research over her entire career - with a thesis on the origin of the glassy particles found in the lunar soils. From 1975 she worked at the National Research Council of Italy (CNR), and later at the National Astrophysics Institute of Italy (INAF). She served as Head of the Institute of Physics of Interplanetary Space (Istituto di Fisica dello Spazio Interplanetario) of INAF from 2001 to 2010.

She was among the first researchers worldwide to study lunar rocks back to Earth by the Apollo missions, working on lunar samples during 1970s. She was Principal Investigator (PI) of the VIRTIS (Visible and Infrared Thermal Imaging Spectrometer) on the Rosetta mission, and of the VIMS visible channel on the Cassini-Huygens mission (1991–2011). Between 2005 and 2011, she was PI of the JIRAM (Jovian Infrared Auroral Mapper) instrument for the NASA New Frontiers Juno mission.

=== Participation in international scientific projects ===
- Co-investigator for NASA lunar and planetary research (1970–74);
- Member of the Science Team for the CIRS and VIMS instruments, and PI of the VIMS visible channel, Cassini-Huygens mission (1991–2011)
- Coordinator of the Moon Orbiting Observatory (MORO) proposal and member of the MORO science team (1993–96);
- Member of the Observing Time Allocation Committee (OTAC) for the ESA Infrared Observatory (ISO) mission (1994–96);
- Member of the European Southern Observatory (ESO) observing Program Committee, Panel F (1997–99);
- Member of the Scientific Council of the Finnish Academy of Space Studies “Antares” (1999–2004);
- Member of the Scientific Council of the International Institute of Space Studies (ISSI), headquartered in Bern (1999–2002);
- Member of the High Scientific Committee of the Paris Observatory;
- PI of the JIRAM Instrument for the NASA New Frontiers Juno mission (2005–2011);
- Member of the Space Advisory Group (SAG) of the European Community (2008–2011);

=== Awards and recognition ===
- Coradini was awarded the 2007 David Bates Medal “In recognition of her important and wide ranging work in planetary sciences and Solar System formation, and her leading role in the development of space infrared instrumentation for planetary exploration”;
- Jean Dominique Cassini Medal & Honorary Membership 2012;
- 2012 NASA Distinguished Public Service Medal;
- Asteroid 4598 Coradini was named in her honour, jointly with her brother Marcello, in recognition of their contributions to the development of planetary science.
- Angioletta crater on Vesta (name approved in 2014);
- On 28 September 2015, the European Space Agency (ESA) named a peak of comet 67P/Churyumov–Gerasimenko “A. Coradini Gate” in her honour.
- Coradini crater on Pluto (name approved in 2022).

== Publications ==
Coradini is the primary author on dozens of scientific publications and co-author on many more.

== Death ==
Coradini died in 2011 from cancer.
