= REX (New Horizons) =

NASA Pluto space probe radio experiment (2015)

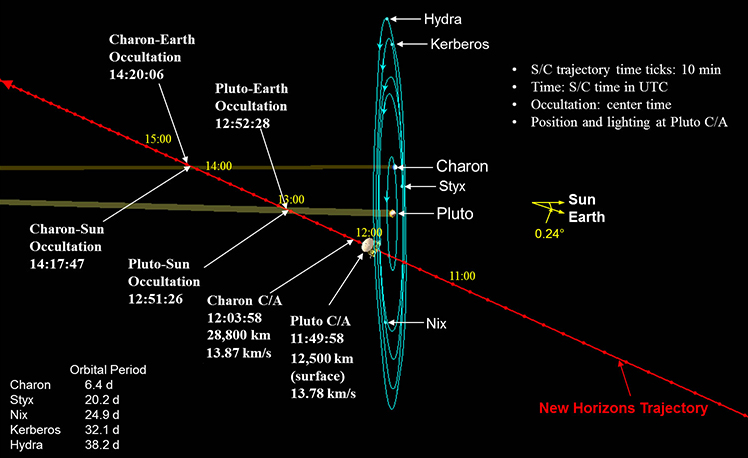
Diagram of the trajectory of New Horizons, which enables the REX experiment to utilize the occultation of Pluto between the spacecraft and Earth to determine atmospheric data

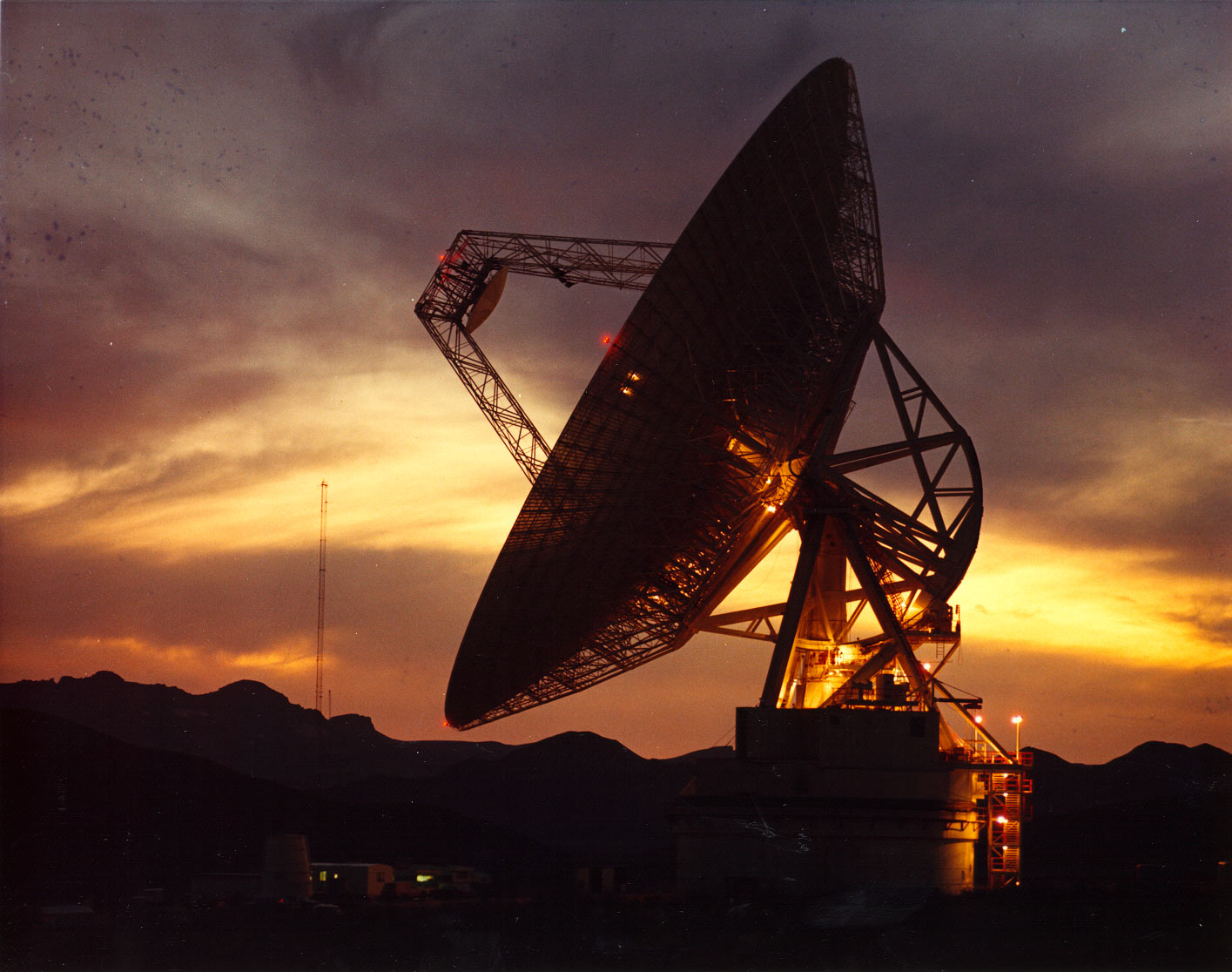
Part of the radio network on Earth, a 70 m antenna at Goldstone, California. REX picks up the signal from Earth during the flyby to record some types of data about the Plutonian system.

REX or Radio Science Experiment is an experiment on the New Horizons space probe to measure properties of the atmosphere of Pluto during the 2015 flyby.

== Experiment ==
Experiment was designed with several goals including determination of pressure and temperature of Plutonian atmosphere, measurements of a possible ionosphere of Pluto and Charon, recording thermal emission temperatures, and taking more accurate chord lengths of Charon and Pluto.

To accomplish the goals, as the spacecraft passed by Pluto, it was placed on a path that took it behind the dwarf planet in relation to the Earth, where radio signals from the flyby spacecraft passed through its atmosphere allowing various properties to be determined. REX also took measurements of the atmospheric conditions at Pluto's moon Charon as part of the mission. REX uses an ultrastable oscillator, various electronics, and radio hardware aboard the New Horizons spacecraft. REX uses the X-band radio uplink on the spacecraft.

REX hardware weighs 160g (0.16 kg) and consumes 1.6 watts of spacecraft electrical power. It also makes use of other NH hardware, overall key hardware components for REX include:

- high-gain antenna
- low-noise X-band receiver
- ultrastable oscillator

To take the measurements, REX communicates with the Deep Space Network on Earth.

Observation goals:

- temperature profiles of Pluto's atmosphere
- pressure profiles of Pluto's atmosphere
- radiometric temperature
- gravitational moments
- ionosphere structure

== Extended mission ==
REX is also being used in the New Horizon's post Pluto extended mission, including the 486958 Arrokoth flyby. REX is being used to take thermal measurements of the Kuiper belt body during the flyby. REX is also used to study the amount of electrons in outer space in the Kuiper belt region. The Kuiper belt is a ring of orbiting bodies between approximately 30 to 55 AU (Earth-Sun distances), home to Pluto and short-period comets it is estimated to consist of hundreds of thousand if not millions of small icy objects. The belt was discovered in 1992, and can be studied more closely by the New Horizons mission which passed through it in the late 2010s.

During the post Pluto cruise, REX is normally turned on monthly to measure the electron density of the solar wind between Earth and the spacecraft. When New Horizons flew by Pluto in 2015, it was at about 32.9 AU from the Sun, and about 43.6 AU for the New Year's Day 2019 flyby of Arrokoth.

The timing of the Arrokoth flyby was adjusted in part to aid the use of the REX experiment, so that more radar dishes on Earth could be used.

== Data from REX ==
Using REX radio occultation data the diameter of Pluto was found to be 2376.6±3.2 km in a 2017 paper.

== See also ==
- Gravity science (Juno) (Experiment aboard Juno Jupiter orbiter that uses radio and time)
- Mariner 4 (radio experiment helped determine more accurate atmospheric conditions about Mars in the 1960s)
