= UVS (Juno) =

Spectrometer instrument on the Juno orbiter

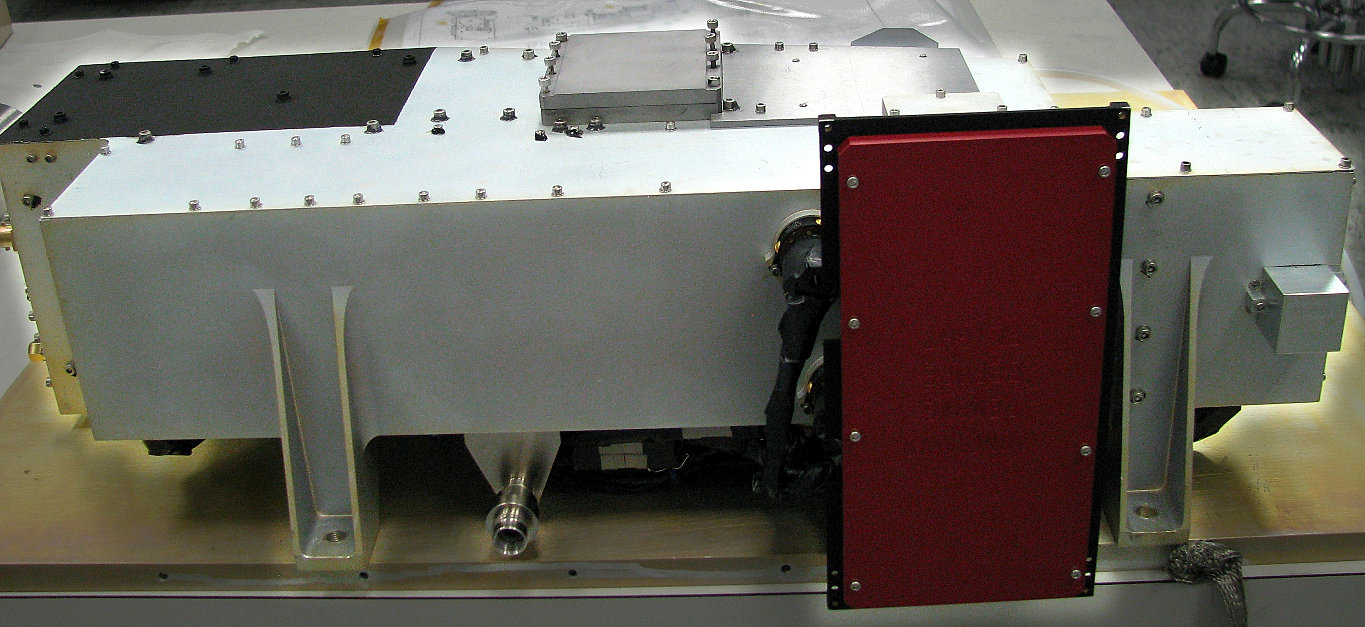
Juno's UVS instrument

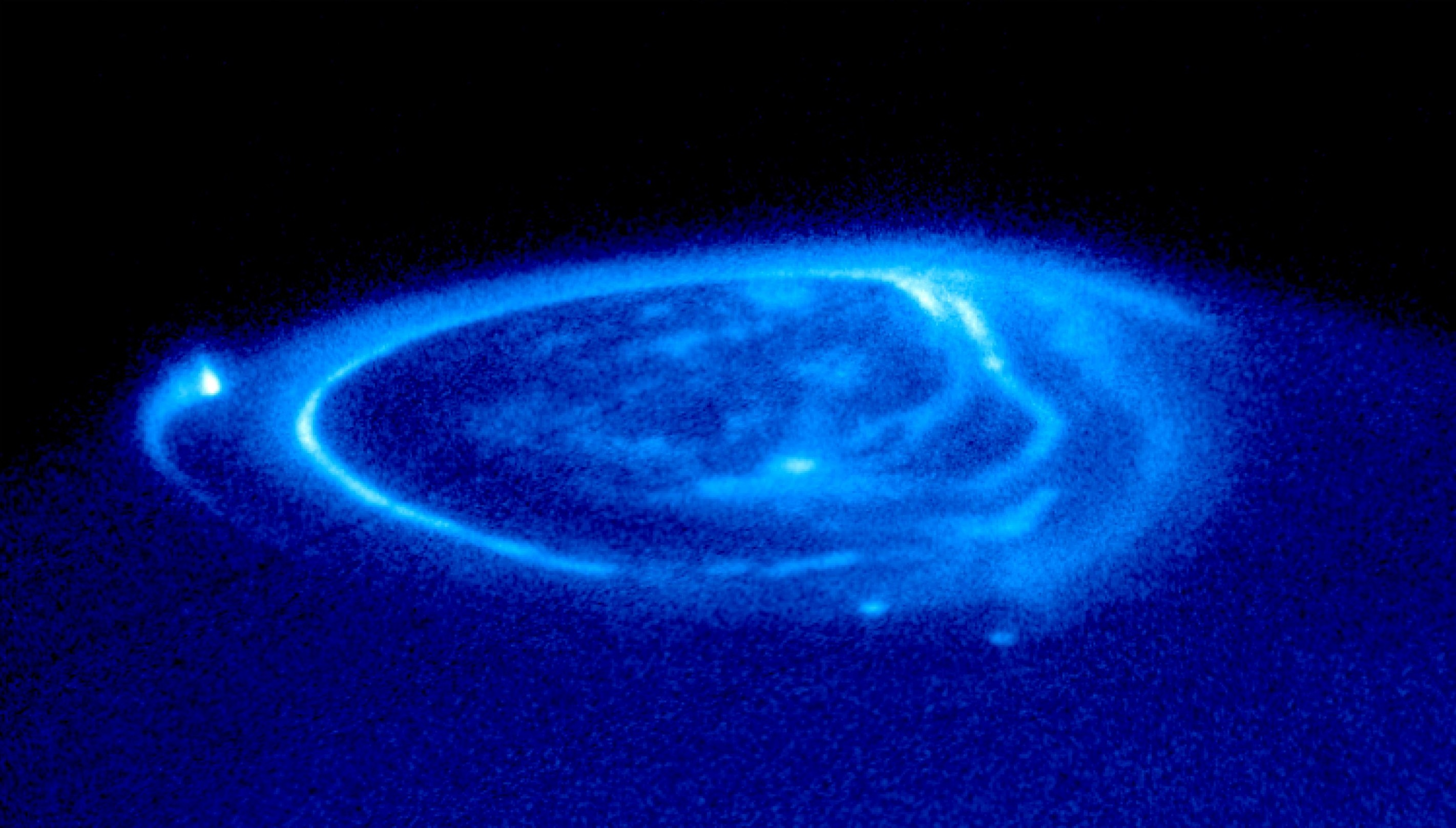
Ultraviolet image of Jupiter's aurora; the bright spot at far left is the end of field line to Io; spots at bottom lead to Ganymede and Europa. This was taken by the Hubble Space Telescope from Earth orbit, using the Space Telescope Imaging Spectrograph

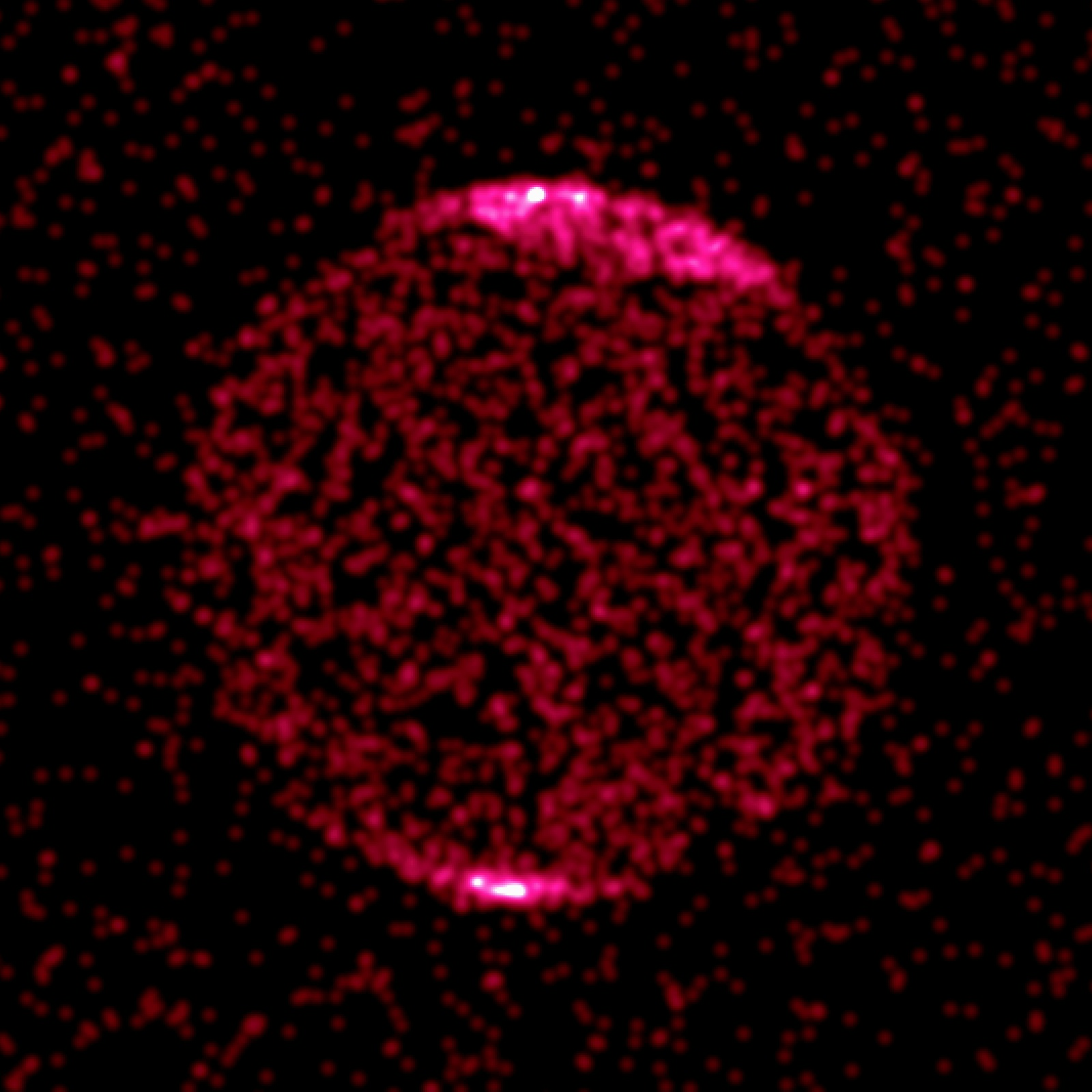
Here is an observation of Jupiter in X-rays by Chandra. CXO's high angular resolution provided a theory-challenging breakthrough—why were the emissions coming from the poles?

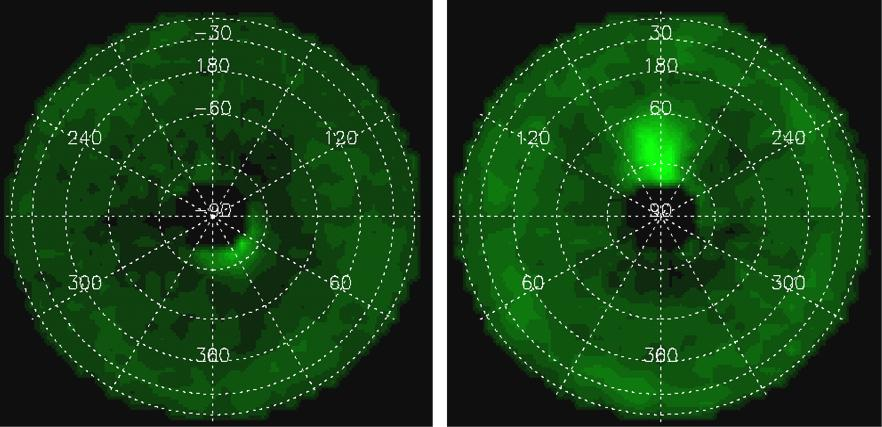
Distribution of acetylene at Jupiter's poles; this data was collected by the CIRS instrument on the Cassini spacecraft during its 2001 flyby of Jupiter.

UVS, known as the Ultraviolet Spectrograph or Ultraviolet Imaging Spectrometer is the name of an instrument on the Juno orbiter for Jupiter. The instrument is an imaging spectrometer that observes the ultraviolet range of light wavelengths, which is shorter wavelengths than visible light but longer than X-rays. Specifically, it is focused on making remote observations of the aurora, detecting the emissions of gases such as hydrogen in the far-ultraviolet. UVS will observes light from as short a wavelength as 70 nm up to 200 nm, which is in the extreme and far ultraviolet range of light. The source of aurora emissions of Jupiter is one of the goals of the instrument. UVS is one of many instruments on Juno, but it is in particular designed to operate in conjunction with JADE, which observes high-energy particles. With both instruments operating together, both the UV emissions and high-energy particles at the same place and time can be synthesized. This supports the Goal of determining the source of the Jovian magnetic field. There has been a problem understanding the Jovian aurora, ever since Chandra determined X-rays were coming not from, as it was thought Io's orbit but from the polar regions. Every 45 minutes an X-ray hot-spot pulsates, corroborated by a similar previous detection in radio emissions by Galileo and Cassini spacecraft. One theory is that its related to the solar wind. The mystery is not that there are X-rays coming Jupiter, which has been known for decades, as detected by previous X-ray observatories, but rather why with the Chandra observation, that pulse was coming from the north polar region.

There is two main parts to UVS, the optical section and an electronics box. It has a small reflecting telescope and also a scan mirror, and it can do long-slit spectrography. UVS uses a Rowland circle spectrograph and a toroidal holographical grating. The detector uses a micro-channel plate detector with the sensor being a CsI photocathode to detect the UV light

UVS was launched aboard the Juno spacecraft on August 5, 2011 (UTC) from Cape Canaveral, USA, as part of the New Frontiers program, and after an interplanetary journey that including a swingby of Earth, entered a polar orbit of Jupiter on July 5, 2016 (UTC),

For detection of following gasses in the far UV:

- Hydrogen (H)
- Molecular hydrogen (H_{2})
- Methane (CH_{4})
- Acetylene (C_{2}H_{2})

UVS is similar to ultraviolet spectrometers flown on New Horizons (Pluto probe), Rosetta (comet probe) and the Lunar Reconnaissance Orbiter. One of the changes is shielding to help the instrument endure Jupiter's radiation environment.

The electronics are located inside the Juno Radiation Vault, which uses titanium to protect it and other spacecraft electronics. The UVS electronics include two power supplies and data processing. UVS electronics box uses an Actel 8051 microcontroller.

UVS was developed at the Space Science Department at Southwest Research Institute

UVIS data in concert with JEDI observations detected electrical potentials of 400,000 electron volts (400 keV), 20-30 times higher than Earth, driving charged particles into the polar regions of Jupiter.

There was a proposal to use Juno's UVS (and JIRAM) in collaboration with the Hubble Space Telescope instruments STIS and ACS to study Jupiter aurora in UV.

== Observations ==
UVS has been used to observe aurora of Jupiter. Since UVS is on the Juno spacecraft as it orbits Jupiter, it has been able to observe both the day and night side aurora, from distance ranging from seven, to 0.05 Jupiter radii. One results as that some auroral emissions are related to the local magnetic time.

Observations with the instrument have suggested that a different mechanism that understood to create Earth aurora's may be occurring.

UVS observed Jupiter's Moon Io, along with several other instruments. The moon's polar regions were observed, and there was evidence of a volcanic plume.

== See also ==
- Imaging spectrometer
- Ultraviolet astronomy
- Jovian Auroral Distributions Experiment
- Cosmic Origins Spectrograph
- Microwave Radiometer (Juno)
- Europa Ultraviolet Spectrograph
- Gravity Science
- MAVEN (also has ultraviolet instrument, used at planet Mars)
- Ralph (New Horizons) (Visible and near infrared imaging spectrometer on New Horizons)
- Alice (spacecraft instrument) (UV imaging spectrometer on New Horizons and Rosetta space probes)
