= UUS (disambiguation) =

Ununseptium (Uus) is the former systematic name of a chemical element now named tennessine (Ts).

UUS or Uus may also refer to:

- Ullevål University Hospital (Ullevål universitetssykehus), Oslo, Norway
- Yuzhno-Sakhalinsk Airport, Russia (IATA code)
- Investigation Bureau for Railway, Funicular and Boat Accidents (Unfalluntersuchungsstelle für Bahnen und Schiffe)
- Uus (comedian), Indonesian stand-up comedian
