= Gravity science (Juno) =

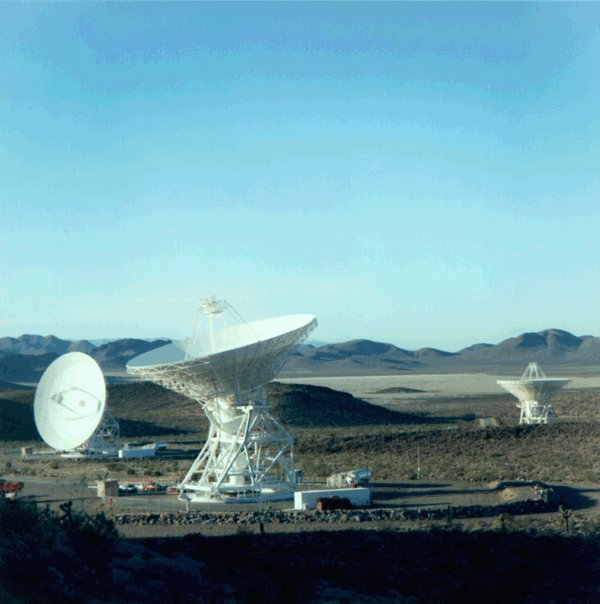
The gravity science experiment for Juno involves using communication hardware on Juno and Earth. Deep Space Network antenna shown here.

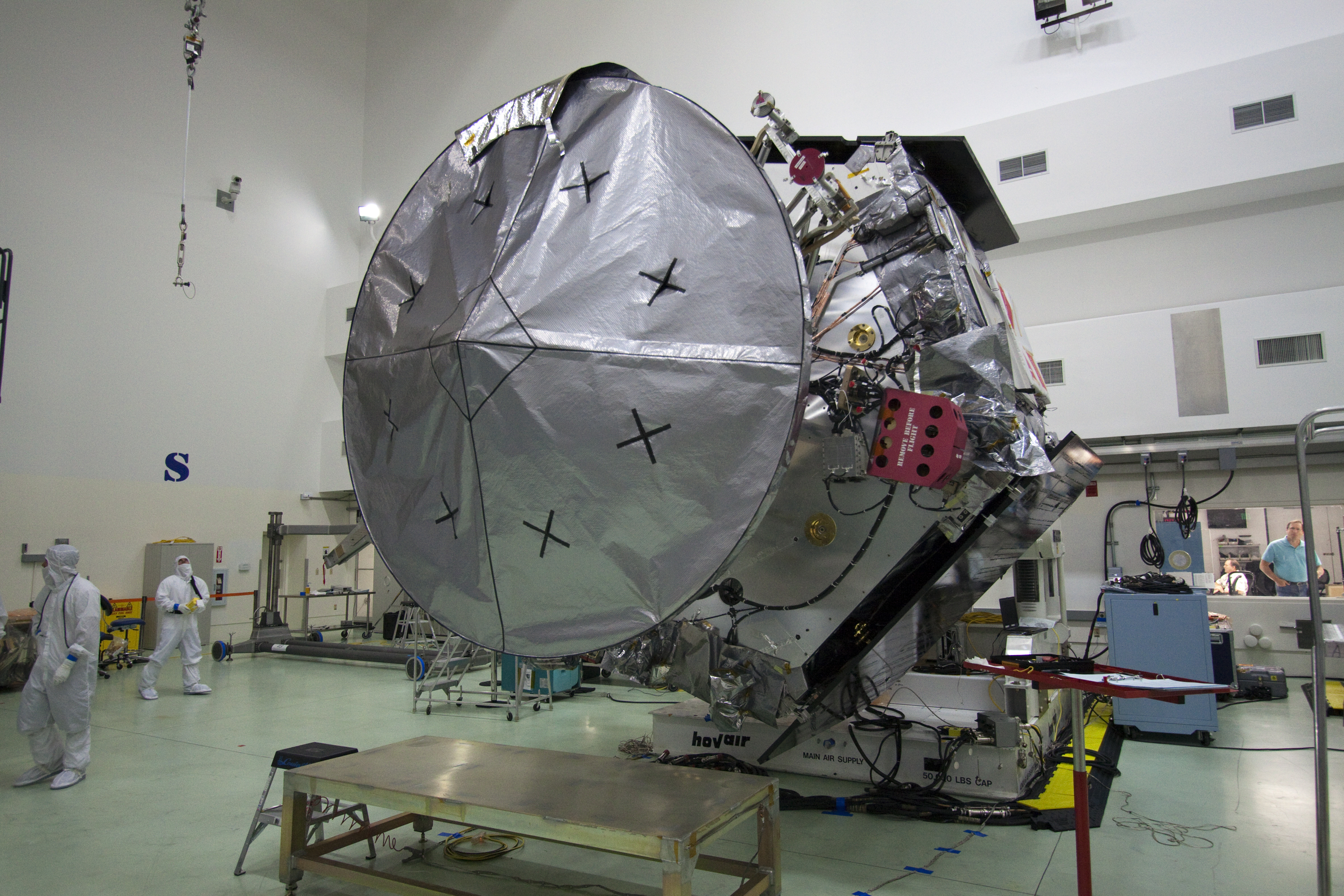
The Juno gravity experiment makes use of spacecraft's antenna, which are used to send radio signals to Earth with precise timing. This allows the Doppler effect to be recorded, which in turn allows the calculation of the gravity field around Jupiter.

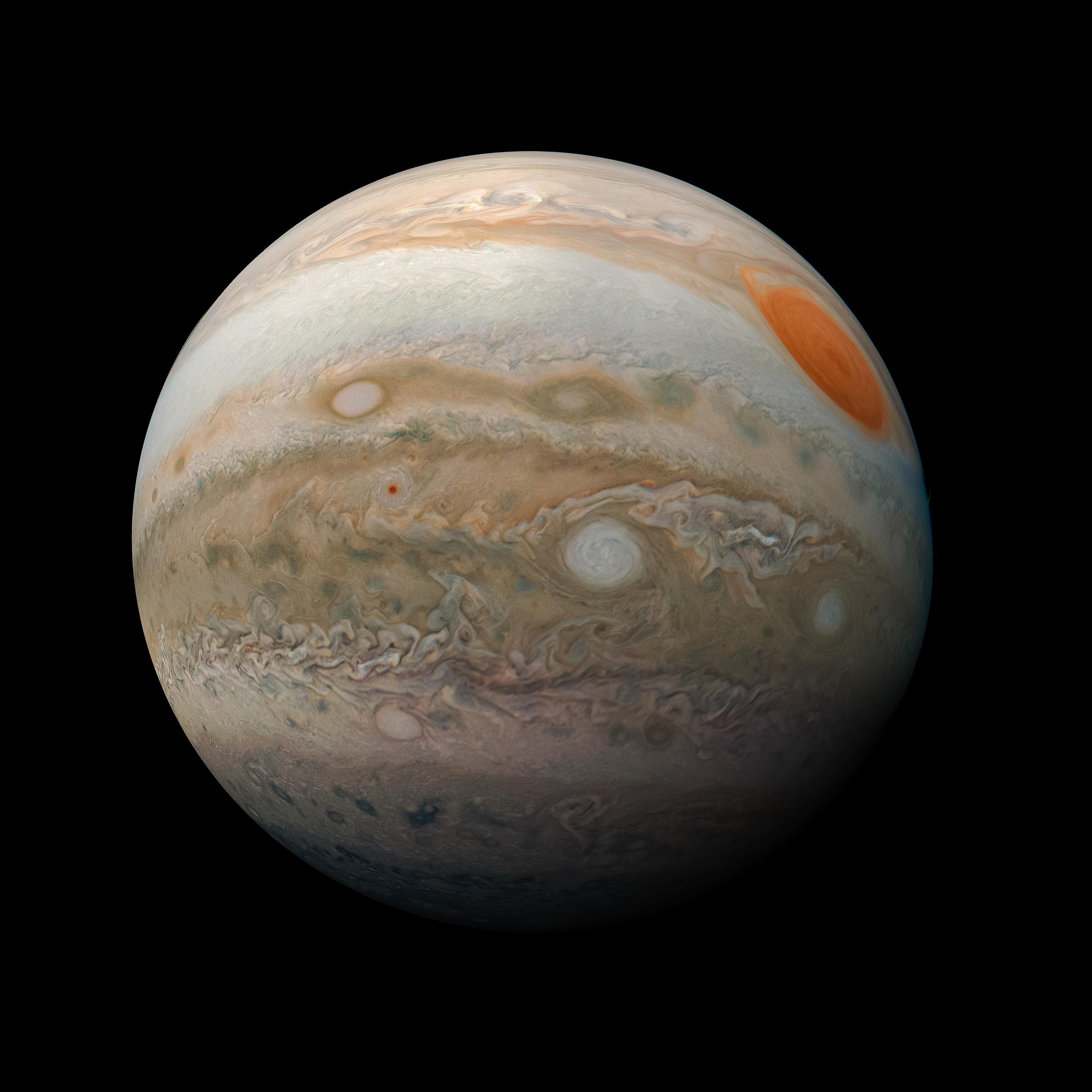
Jupiter shown in the image 'Jupiter Marble' as recorded by Juno

The Gravity Science experiment and instrument set aboard the Juno Jupiter orbiter is designed to monitor Jupiter's gravity. It maps Jupiter's gravitational field, which will allow the interior of Jupiter to be better understood. It uses special hardware on Juno, and also on Earth, including the high-gain K-band and X-band communication systems of the Deep Space Network as well as Juno's Ka-band Translator System (KaTS). These components work together to detect minute changes in radio frequency (Doppler shift) to measure the spacecraft's velocity over time. The KaTS box was funded by the Italian Space Agency and overseen by professor Luciano Iess from University La Sapienza in Rome. KaTS detects signals coming from the DSN on Earth, and then sends replies in a very precise way that allows the velocity of Juno to be determined to within 0.001 millimeters per second. The spacecraft receives a tone signal on the X or Ka band and then replies using the Ka-band radio.

As the spacecraft traverses the space near Jupiter, the planet, and even variations in the planets interior, cause a variation in Juno velocity. The gravity science experiment measures these velocity changes using a combination of hardware on Earth and the spacecraft, which allows the effect of gravity to be measured, and thereby mass variations in Jupiter's interior.

Communication signals:

- Deep Space Network sends a tone signal at 7.1 GHz (X-band) and 34 GHz (Ka-Band)
- Juno KaTS sends tone signal at 8.5 GHz (X-band) and 32 GHz (Ka-Band)

Juno launched in 2011 and arrived at Jupiter orbit in July 2016.

The GS was planned out to be used on orbits 4, orbit 9, and orbits 10 through 32. When GS operates it must point its antenna at Earth, and is not operated simultaneously with the Microwave Radiometer instrument on Juno. The parameters of the GS experiment were adjusted to account for a 53-day orbit the Juno spacecraft ended up being in.

The GS experiment uses Deep Space Network's DSS-25 antenna which is equipped with simultaneous dual X- and Ka-band transmitters and receivers, as well as the spacecraft which also has X and Ka-band radio systems.

== Observations ==
The 53-day orbit (rather than the originally planned orbit) produced certain challenges for the GS experiment, which required signals to be sent between the DSN on Earth and the spacecraft. It was possible to make measurements, although various configurations were tried for the first five Perijoves between July 2016 and September 2017.

It was possible to use the data from the observations, and from just the first two Perijoves the accuracy of Jupiter's gravity field record was increased by factor of five according to one report. This data allowed further insight to Jupiter's internal structure.

Additional data collections refined by understanding of the early recordings is planned for the experiment.

== See also ==
- NASA Deep Space Network
- GRACE and GRACE-FO (GRACE, gravity science spacecraft for Earth)
- Jovian Infrared Auroral Mapper (ASI contributed instrument)
- REX (New Horizons) (Radio science experiment for Pluto probe)
