= VUS =

VUS or Vus may refer to:

- Variant of uncertain significance in genetic testing
- Vus (Crna Trava), village in Serbia
- Vjesnik u srijedu, Croatian newspaper
- Veliky Ustyug Airport
- All-Russian Teachers' Union (Russian: Vserossiiskii soiuz uchitelei)
