= Europa Ultraviolet Spectrograph =

Ultraviolet spectrograph imager

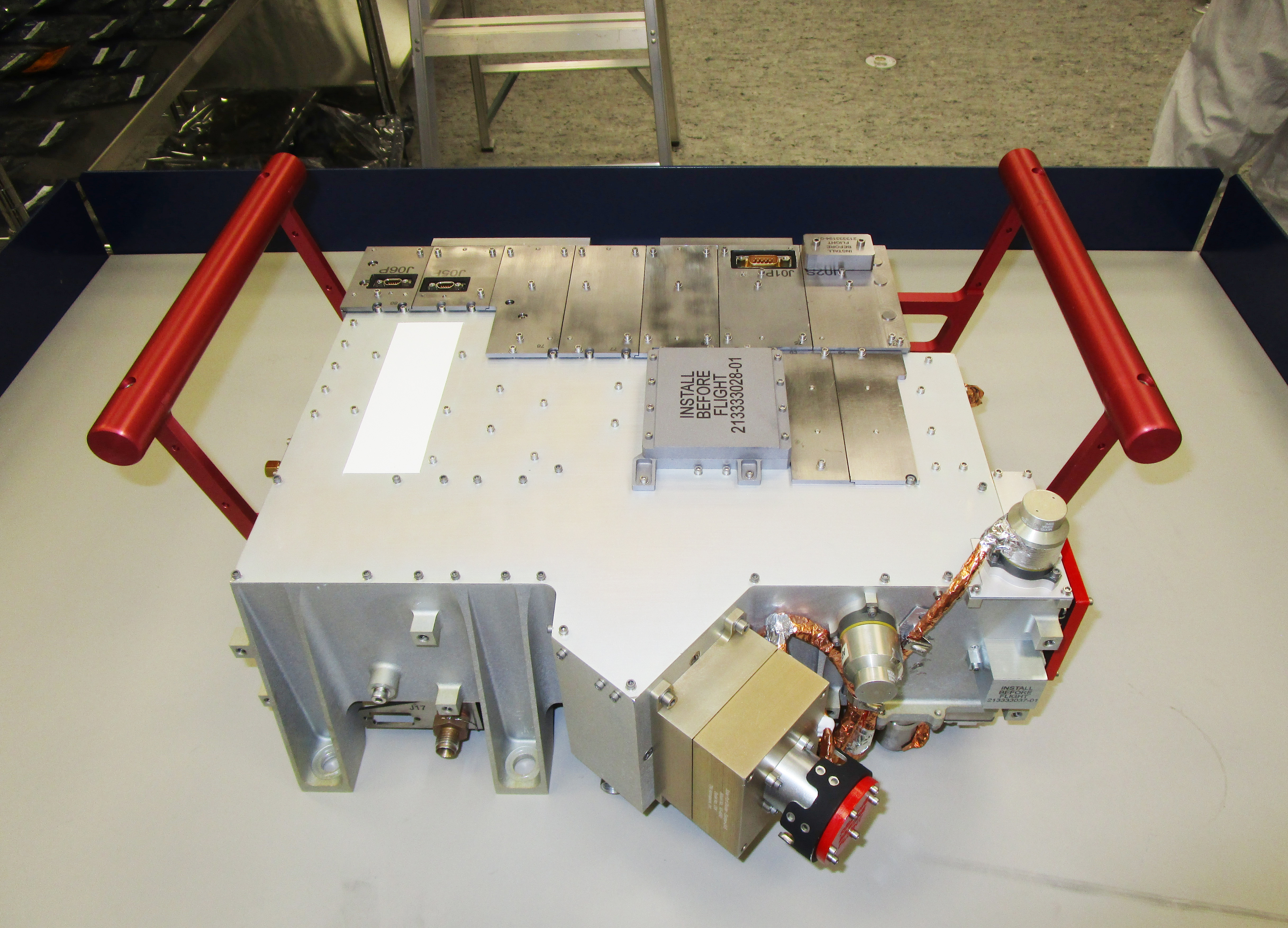
- Europa-UVS Final Configuration
- Operator: NASA
- Instrument type: Ultraviolet spectrograph
- Function: detector and analyzer
- Mission duration: Cruise: 3-6 years Science phase: ≥ 3 years

Properties
- Spectral band: ultraviolet

Host spacecraft
- Spacecraft: Europa Clipper
- Operator: NASA
- Launch date: October 14, 2024, 16:06:00 UTC (12:06 p.m. EDT)
- Rocket: Falcon Heavy
- Launch site: Kennedy Space Center

The Europa Ultraviolet Spectrograph (Europa-UVS) is an ultraviolet spectrograph imager that will be flown on board the Europa Clipper mission to Jupiter's moon Europa. The Europa-UVS will be able to detect small erupting plumes and will provide data about the composition and dynamics of Europa's thin exosphere.

The Principal Investigator is Kurt Retherford of the Southwest Research Institute (SwRI), and the instrument engineer is Laura Jones-Wilson from JPL.

== Overview ==
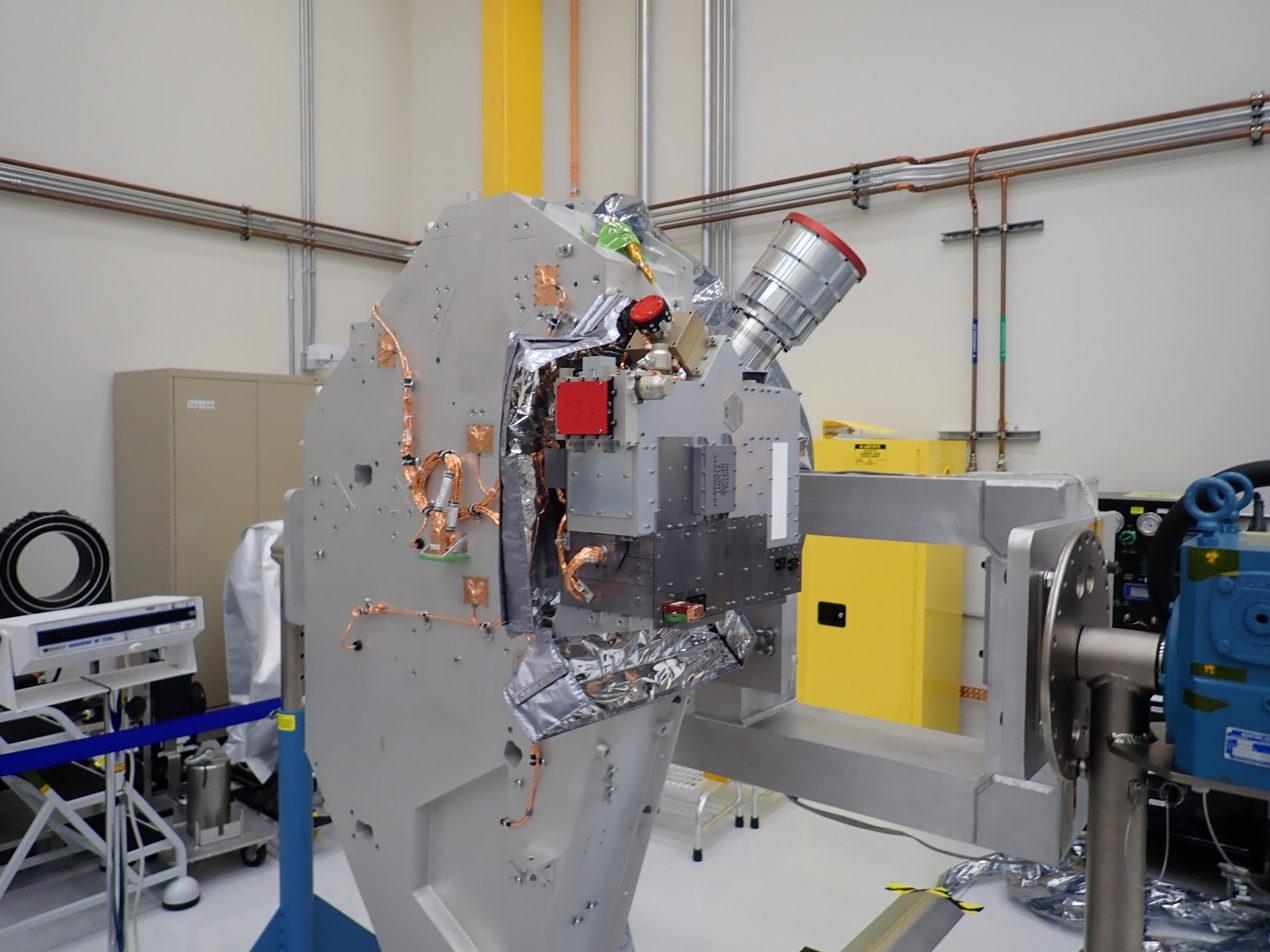
The spectrograph is the gray and silver metal box on the upper right of the nadir deck (the thick matte-gray polygonal structure filling about one-third of the image).

The Europa Ultraviolet Spectrograph inherits technology from a series of successful ultraviolet imaging spectrographs (Rosetta-Alice, New Horizons-Alice, LRO-LAMP, Juno-UVS and JUICE-UVS). Europa-UVS observes photons in the 55-210 nm wavelength range, along a 7.5° slit. A radiation-hardened integrated circuit will be incorporated to meet the radiation requirements.

The Europa-UVS offers additional capabilities to locate and characterize plumes erupting from Europa's surface. UVS will also investigate the composition and chemistry of Europa's atmosphere, its surface, and study how energy and mass flow around the moon and its environment.

The instrument is a sensitive imaging spectrograph that can observe in the ultraviolet spectral range of 55 nm to 210 nm and can achieve a spectral resolution of <0.6 nm. The instrument does not contain a scan mirror, so the spacecraft must provide the maneuvering capability necessary to obtain complete spatial images of the moon.

== Objectives ==
The science objectives of the Europa-UVS investigation are:

- Determine the composition and chemistry, source and sinks, and structure and variability of Europa's atmosphere.
- Search for and characterize active plumes in terms of global distribution, structure, composition, and variability.
- Explore the surface composition and microphysics and their relation to endogenic and exogenic processes.
- Investigate how energy and mass flow in the Europa atmosphere, neutral cloud and plasma torus, and footprint on Jupiter.

== See also ==
- UVS (Juno) (Instrument on the Juno Jupiter orbiter which arrived at Jupiter in 2016)
