= Off-axis optical system =

An off-axis optical system is an optical system in which the optical axis of the aperture is not coincident with the mechanical center of the aperture. The principal applications of off-axis optical systems are to avoid obstruction of the primary aperture by secondary optical elements, instrument packages, or sensors, and to provide ready access to instrument packages or sensors at the focus. The engineering tradeoff of an off-axis optical system is an increase in image aberrations.

There are various theoretical models for aberration in off-axis optical systems. This involves various techniques including different types of equations for ray-tracing, and a goal can be optimizing the design.

An example of an off-axis optical system is a three mirror design as optics for a hyperspectral imager.

== See also ==
- Off-axis reflecting telescope
