= Marialite =

Sodium endmember in the scapolite group of tectosilicate minerals

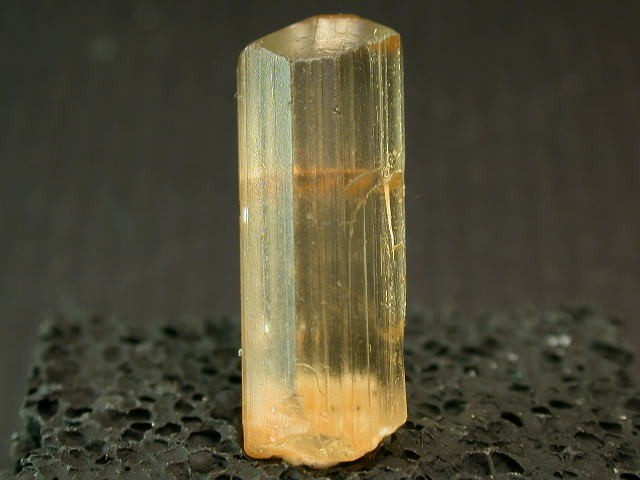

General
- Category: Tectosilicate minerals
- Group: Scapolite group
- Formula: Na_{4}Al_{3}Si_{9}O_{24}Cl
- IMA symbol: Mar
- Strunz classification: 9.FB.15
- Crystal system: Tetragonal
- Crystal class: Dipyramidal (4/m) (same H-M symbol)
- Space group: I4/m
- Unit cell: a = 12.06 Å, c = 7.572(3) Å; Z = 2

Identification
- Color: Colorless, white, grey; pink, violet, blue, yellow, brown, orange-brown, pale green or reddish
- Crystal habit: Typically flat, pyramidal striated crystals; massive, granular
- Cleavage: Distinct on {100} and {110}
- Fracture: Uneven to conchoidal
- Tenacity: Brittle
- Mohs scale hardness: 5 1/2–6
- Luster: Vitreous, pearly, resinous
- Streak: White
- Diaphaneity: Transparent to opaque
- Specific gravity: 2.55–2.74
- Density: 2.5–2.62 g/cm^{3}
- Optical properties: Uniaxial (−)
- Refractive index: n_{ω} = 1.539–1.550 n_{ε} = 1.532–1.541
- Birefringence: δ = 0.007 – 0.009

Marialite is a silicate mineral with a chemical formula of Na_{4}Al_{3}Si_{9}O_{24}Cl if a pure endmember or Na_{4}(AlSi_{3}O_{8})_{3}(Cl_{2},CO_{3},SO_{4}) with increasing meionite content. Marialite is the sodium endmember of the scapolite group and a solid solution exists between marialite and meionite, the calcium endmember. It is a rare mineral usually used as a collector's stone.

== Crystallography ==
Marialite has tetragonal crystallography and a 4/m crystal class. It has a 4 fold rotation with 90° mirror planes. Crystals are usually prismatic with prominent forms of prisms and dipyramids.

Marialite belongs to a uniaxial negative optical class which means it has one circular section and a principal section shaped like an oblate sphenoid.

== Discovery and occurrence ==
Marialite was first described in 1866 for an occurrence in the Phlegrean Volcanic complex, Campania, Italy. It was named by German mineralogist Gerhard vom Rath for his wife, Maria Rosa vom Rath.

Marialite occurs in regional and contact metamorphism: marble, calcareous gneiss, granulite and greenschist. It also occurs in skarn, pegmatite and hydrothermally altered volcanic rocks. This means that Marialite is formed in high pressure and/or high temperature environments.
