= Odegaard =

Odegaard, Odegard, Ødegaard and Ødegård are variants of a Norwegian surname derived from a farm name meaning "deserted farm".

== People with the surname ==
People sharing one of these names as a surname include:

- Alexander Ødegaard (born 1980), Norwegian football player
- Annika Odegard, Canadian voice actress
- Charles Odegaard (1911–1999), American president of the University of Washington
- Don Odegard (born 1966), American NFL cornerback
- Emil Ødegaard (born 1999), Norwegian footballer
- Gary Odegaard (born 1940), American politician
- Gregory Odegard, American materials researcher and academic
- Hans Ødegaard (1876–1943), Norwegian painter
- Hans Erik Ødegaard (born 1974), Norwegian footballer
- Hans Petter Ødegård (born 1959), Norwegian cyclist
- Hallvard Ødegaard (born 1945), Norwegian professor
- Hedda Ødegaard (born 1995), Norwegian tennis player
- Henrik Ødegaard (born 1988), Norwegian ice hockey player
- Ingrid Ødegård (born 1983), Norwegian handball goalkeeper
- Jan Tore Odegard (born 1940), Norwegian consultant and politician
- Jarle Ødegaard (born 1959), Norwegian footballer
- Jon Ødegaard (1937–2002), Norwegian speedway rider
- Jon Eirik Ødegaard (born 1972), Norwegian footballer
- Kevin Odegard (born 1950), American singer-songwriter and guitarist
- Knut Jørgen Røed Ødegaard (born 1966), Norwegian astrophysicist
- Knut Ødegård (born 1945), Norwegian writer
- Kris Odegard (born 1980), Canadian racquetball player
- Kristian Ødegård (born 1974), Norwegian television personality and comedian
- Kristine Ødegaard (born 1962), Norwegian ski-orienteering competitor
- Lars Ødegård (born 1956), Norwegian organizational leader and politician
- Magnar Ødegaard (born 1993), Norwegian footballer
- Martin Ødegaard (born 1998), Norwegian football player
- Niels Ødegaard (1892–1976), Norwegian educator, newspaper editor and politician
- Niklas Ødegård (born 2004), Norwegian football player
- Nina Ellen Ødegård (born 1979), Norwegian actress
- Olaf Odegaard (1938–1997), American artist and playwright
- Ørnulv Ødegård (1901–1986), Norwegian psychiatrist
- Ove Ødegaard (1931–1964), Norwegian football player
- Peter H. Odegard (1901–1966), American political scientist
- Reidar Ødegaard (1901–1972), Norwegian cross country skier
- Robert J. Odegard (1920–2013), American politician
- Tor Øivind Ødegård (born 1969), Norwegian middle distance runner
- Unni Ødegård (born 1974), Norwegian cross-country skier

== Places ==
Places that include one of these terms in their names include:

- Ødegården Verk, an abandoned mine in Bamble Municipality, Norway
- Odegaard Undergraduate Library, at the University of Washington
- Odegaard Falls, Waterfall in British Columbia, Canada
