= Candice Hansen-Koharcheck =

American planetary scientist

Candice Joy Hansen
- Born: Pasadena, California
- Died: April 11, 2026
- Education: California State University (BS); University of California, Los Angeles (MS, PhD)
- Known for: JunoCam
- Awards: NASA Exceptional Scientific Achievement Medal; NASA Outstanding Public Leadership Medal; G.K. Gilbert Award
- Scientific career
- Fields: Planetary sciences
- Workplaces: Planetary Science Institute; NASA Jet Propulsion Laboratory

Candice Joy Hansen-Koharcheck (died April 11, 2026) was an American planetary scientist. She is responsible for the development and operation of the JunoCam, for which she received the NASA Outstanding Public Leadership Medal in 2018.

== Education and early life ==
Hansen was born and raised in Pasadena, California. She received her Bachelor of Science in Physics from California State University, Fullerton in 1976. While there she was taught by Dorothy Woolum, who had worked on the Apollo program.

Hansen originally enrolled in graduate school at the University of Arizona, where her advisor was Bradford A. Smith, who led the Voyager program. Smith convinced her to leave Tucson, Arizona, to work in NASA's Jet Propulsion Laboratory (JPL) on the Voyager Imaging Team. She designed the imaging sequences for the flybys with Jupiter, Saturn, Uranus and Neptune.

From 1981 to 1984, when the Voyager was between Saturn and Uranus, Hansen worked at the German Space Operations Center in Oberpfaffenhofen. While working at JPL, Hansen completed a Master of Science in Planetary Physics (1989) and her Doctor of Philosophy in Earth and Space Science (1994) at the University of California, Los Angeles.

== Research and career ==
In 1990, Hansen started working on the Cassini mission as part of the Ultraviolet Imaging Spectrograph (UVIS) investigation team. Also in 1990, Hansen co-designed the command sequence for the famous Pale Blue Dot photograph taken by Voyager 1, together with Carolyn Porco. She received the 2002 JPL Exceptional Leadership Award for her involvement in the planning of the Jupiter flyby.

Hansen was part of the team within the Cassini mission that studies the plumes on Enceladus, one of Saturn's moons. This research has confirmed the idea that there are subsurface bodies of water on Enceladus. For her work on the water vapor plumes on Enceladus, Hansen received the Edward Stone Award in 2007 and the NASA Exceptional Scientific Achievement Medal in 2009. Hansen retired from the JPL in 2010, but continued her work as senior scientist at the Planetary Science Institute in Tucson, Arizona.

Hansen was deputy Principal Investigator for the High Resolution Imaging Science Experiment (HiRISE) on the Mars Reconnaissance Orbiter. As part of HiRISE, Hansen studied the seasonal carbon-dioxide ice on Mars. She ran experiments on Earth using dry ice to study the possibility of carbon dioxide ice to be responsible for the gullies that were seen in the HiRISE images. She also co-authored a book titled 'Mars: The Pristine Beauty of the Red Planet', a collection of HiRISE images.

She was a collaborator on the Juno mission, and she was responsible for the JunoCam, the first interplanetary outreach camera coordinated by Juno co-collaborator Glenn Orton. The camera has produced the first close-up images of Jupiter's polar region. It was also used to capture images of volcanic plumes on Io, one of Jupiter's moons. For her work on the JunoCam, she received the NASA Outstanding Public Leadership medal in 2018.

== Awards ==
- 2002 JPL Exceptional Leadership Award for her involvement in the planning of the Jupiter flyby in the Cassini mission.
- 2007 Edward Stone Award for work on the water vapor plumes on Enceladus.
- 2009 NASA Exceptional Scientific Achievement Medal for work on the water vapor plumes on Enceladus.
- 2018 NASA Outstanding Public Leadership Medal for work on JunoCam.
- 2023 Geological Society of America G.K. Gilbert Award.
