= Glenn Orton =

American planetary scientist and astronomer

Glenn Scott Orton
- Born: July 24, 1948 (age 77); Fall River, Massachusetts, U.S.
- Education: Brown University (ScB) 1970; California Institute of Technology (PhD) 1975
- Awards: NASA Exceptional Scientific Achievement Medal; NASA Group Achievement Award
- Scientific career
- Fields: Planetary Science; Astronomy
- Institutions: NASA Jet Propulsion Laboratory; California Institute of Technology
- Thesis: Observations and Analysis of 8 – 14 Micron Thermal Emission of Jupiter: a Model of Thermal Structure and Cloud Properties (1975)
- Doctoral advisor: Andrew P. Ingersoll

Glenn Scott Orton (born July 24, 1948) is an American planetary scientist and astronomer. Orton is a lead research scientist in the Planetary and Exoplanetary Atmospheres Group working on the Juno mission at the NASA Jet Propulsion Laboratory, where he has spent his entire career.

Orton studies the gas giant planets and is credited with modeling the structure and composition of Uranus's atmosphere, for which he was awarded a NASA Exceptional Scientific Achievement Medal.

An asteroid is named for him.

== Education and personal life ==
Orton was born in Fall River, Massachusetts. He became interested in astronomy at age six when his parents gifted him the Book of Knowledge, one of the Wonder Books. He grew up observing the planet Jupiter from his backyard with an amateur telescope and began doing science fair projects while he was in primary school. In 1965, he participated in his high school's science fair, focusing on Jupiter, for which he won first prize. He graduated from Joseph Case High School in Swansea, Massachusetts, in 1966.

Orton was a first-generation college student. He was awarded a Bachelor of Science from Brown University in Physics; he graduated cum laude in 1970. He received his Doctor of Philosophy in Planetary Sciences in 1975 from the California Institute of Technology (Caltech). His thesis involved analyzing radio wave emissions from ground and space-based observations from the Pioneer 10 and Pioneer 11 spacecraft to model Jupiter's thermal and cloud structures.

Orton is also an instructor at the San Gabriel Valley Region of the Porsche Club of America, where he was awarded "Driver of the Year" in 2011 and won timed trial championships. He is married and has two children.

== Research and career ==
Orton is a lead Juno mission team member and staff astronomer at the Jet Propulsion Laboratory (JPL) in La Cañada Flintridge, California. He joined as an associate researcher in 1975, as part of the NASA Post Doctoral Program. He has remained at JPL through his career as a research scientist since 1977, and was promoted into a senior role in 1995. He became a supervisor in the Planetary and Exoplanetary Atmospheres Group at JPL in 2022.

Orton began studying Jupiter's atmosphere using multi-messenger astronomy in 1978. He has observed Jupiter at the W. M. Keck Observatory, the NASA Infrared Telescope Facility (IRTF), and the National Astronomical Observatory of Japan. Orton has also studied other gas giants, including Uranus, Neptune, and Saturn. He was also granted observation time for the gas giants at Palomar Observatory, the Stratospheric Observatory for Infrared Astronomy, the Very Large Telescope, the Hubble Space Telescope, the James Webb Space Telescope, the Cassini Space Telescope, Spitzer Space Telescope, and the Herschel Space Observatory.

While observing Jupiter at the IRTF in 1994, Orton witnessed Comet Shoemaker-Levy 9 collide with the planet. In 2009, after receiving a tip from an amateur astronomer in Australia, he observed an asteroid's impact on Jupiter. It was originally believed to have been a comet, or space debris.

During his career, Orton derived the atmospheric model for Uranus's structure and composition. In 2015, NASA awarded Orton the Exceptional Scientific Achievement Medal for this work.

== Public outreach and mentorship ==
Orton is passionate about mentoring undergraduate students so they obtain research experience. He was credited with mentoring more than 270 students in 2024 by the American Astronomical Society. At least 190 of his mentees participated in Caltech's Summer Undergraduate Research Fellowship (SURF), where Orton was JPL's representative on their SURF Advisory Committee as of 2014.

In 2016, Orton coordinated a public outreach camera, called Junocam, in which NASA crowdsourced amateur astronomers to take photos of Jupiter for scientific research. NASA originally instructed the team to scrap the visible spectrum camera from the Juno satellite, as its purpose of the mission was to study the interior of Jupiter. Scott J. Bolton, the principal investigator (PI) of the mission, said his team installed it anyway. The PI of Junocam is Candice Hansen-Koharcheck and her leadership on the project earned her a NASA Outstanding Public Leadership Medal. The camera captured the first close-ups of Jupiter's poles.

== Awards and honors ==
- NASA Exceptional Scientific Achievement Medal, 1997, 2015
- NASA Group Achievement Award, 2012
- Royal Astronomical Society Honorary Fellow, 2019
- American Geophysical Union Fellow, 2020
- American Astronomical Society, Fellow, 2024
- Molecular Physics Achievement Award, 2025
- Asteroid namesake: 378370 Orton

== Selected publications ==
- Orton, G. S.; Muhleman, D. O.; Berge, G. L. (1972). "A Model for the Lower Atmosphere of Venus Based on High Resolution Interferometric Observations at Radio Wavelengths". Bulletin of the American Astronomical Society. 4: 321. Bibcode:1972BAAS....4..321O.
- Orton, Glenn S. (1975). "The thermal structure of Jupiter I. Implications of Pioneer 10 infrared radiometer data". Icarus. 26 (2): 125–141. Bibcode:1975Icar...26..125O. doi:10.1016/0019-1035(75)90075-5.
- Orton, Glenn S. (1975). "The thermal structure of Jupiter II. Observations and analysis of 8–14 micron radiation". Icarus. 26 (2): 142–158. Bibcode:1975Icar...26..142O. doi:10.1016/0019-1035(75)90076-7.
- Orton, Glenn S. (2009). "Ground-Based Observational Support for Spacecraft Exploration of the Outer Planets". Earth, Moon, and Planets. 105 (2–4): 143–152. Bibcode:2009EM&P..105..143O. doi:10.1007/s11038-009-9295-x. ISSN 0167-9295.
- Orton, Glenn S.; Antuñano, Arrate; Fletcher, Leigh N.; Sinclair, James A.; Momary, Thomas W.; Fujiyoshi, Takuya; Yanamandra-Fisher, Padma; Donnelly, Padraig T.; Greco, Jennifer J.; Payne, Anna V.; Boydstun, Kimberly A.; Wakefield, Laura E. (2022-12-19). "Unexpected long-term variability in Jupiter's tropospheric temperatures". Nature Astronomy. 7 (2): 190–197. doi:10.1038/s41550-022-01839-0. ISSN 2397-3366.
- Orton, Glenn S.; Tabataba-Vakili, Fachreddin; Eichstädt, Gerald; Rogers, John; Hansen, Candice J.; Momary, Thomas W.; Ingersoll, Andrew P.; Brueshaber, Shawn; Wong, Michael H.; Simon, Amy A.; Fletcher, Leigh N.; Ravine, Michael; Caplinger, Michael; Smith, Dakota; Bolton, Scott J. (2020). "A Survey of Small-Scale Waves and Wave-Like Phenomena in Jupiter's Atmosphere Detected by JunoCam". Journal of Geophysical Research: Planets. 125 (7) e2019JE006369. Bibcode:2020JGRE..12506369O. doi:10.1029/2019JE006369. ISSN 2169-9097. PMC 7380317. PMID 32728504.
- Orton, Glenn S.; Fletcher, Leigh N.; Encrenaz, Therese; Leyrat, Cedric; Roe, Henry G.; Fujiyoshi, Takuya; Pantin, Eric (2015). "Thermal imaging of Uranus: Upper-tropospheric temperatures one season after Voyager". Icarus. 260: 94–102. Bibcode:2015Icar..260...94O. doi:10.1016/j.icarus.2015.07.004.
- Orton, Glenn S.; Moses, Julianne I.; Fletcher, Leigh N.; Mainzer, Amy K.; Hines, Dean; Hammel, Heidi B.; Martin-Torres, Javier; Burgdorf, Martin; Merlet, Cecile; Line, Michael R. (2014). "Mid-infrared spectroscopy of Uranus from the Spitzer infrared spectrometer: 2. Determination of the mean composition of the upper troposphere and stratosphere". Icarus. 243: 471–493. arXiv:1407.2118. Bibcode:2014Icar..243..471O. doi:10.1016/j.icarus.2014.07.012.
- Orton, Glenn S.; Fletcher, Leigh N.; Moses, Julianne I.; Mainzer, Amy K.; Hines, Dean; Hammel, Heidi B.; Martin-Torres, F. Javier; Burgdorf, Martin; Merlet, Cecile; Line, Michael R. (2014). "Mid-infrared spectroscopy of Uranus from the Spitzer Infrared Spectrometer: 1. Determination of the mean temperature structure of the upper troposphere and stratosphere". Icarus. 243: 494–513. arXiv:1407.2120. Bibcode:2014Icar..243..494O. doi:10.1016/j.icarus.2014.07.010.
- Orton, Glenn S.; Fletcher, Leigh N.; Liu, Junjun; Schneider, Tapio; Yanamandra-Fisher, Padma A.; de Pater, Imke; Edwards, Michelle; Geballe, Thomas R.; Hammel, Heidi B.; Fujiyoshi, Takuya; Encrenaz, Therese; Pantin, Eric; Mousis, Olivier; Fuse, Tetsuharu (2012). "Recovery and characterization of Neptune's near-polar stratospheric hot spot". Planetary and Space Science. 61 (1): 161–167. Bibcode:2012P&SS...61..161O. doi:10.1016/j.pss.2011.06.013.
- Orton, G.S.; Griffin, M.J.; Ade, P.A.R.; Nolt, I.G.; Radostitz, J.V.; Robson, E.I.; Gear, W.K. (1986). "Submillimeter and millimeter observations of Uranus and Neptune". Icarus. 67 (2): 289–304. Bibcode:1986Icar...67..289O. doi:10.1016/0019-1035(86)90110-7.
