= Mia Siochi =

Filipino nanomaterials scientist

Emilie J. Siochi
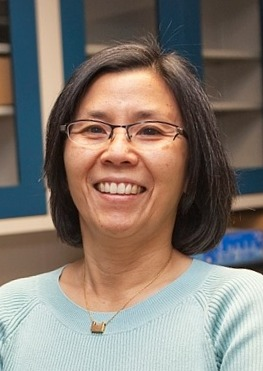
- Siochi at NASA Langley in 2011
- Born: Philippines
- Education: Ateneo de Manila University; Virginia Tech
- Scientific career
- Workplaces: NASA Langley
- Thesis: Dilute solution studies of molecular weight distributions of nitrocellulose, modified lignins and PMMA graft polymers (1989)

Emilie "Mia" J. Siochi is a Filipino nanomaterials scientist and innovator at Langley Research Center. She is named in the NASA Technology Transfer Inventors Hall of Fame, and in 2015 was awarded the Outstanding Technical Contribution in Government Award in 2015.

== Early life and education ==
Siochi was born in the Philippines. She completed her undergraduate studies in chemistry at Ateneo de Manila University. She moved to Virginia Tech for her graduate studies, earning a master's and a doctorate in materials science. Her master's research was supported by the fluid dynamics section of Langley Research Center. She was tasked with identifying coatings that can prevent insects sticking to aircraft wings. She tested a range of different coatings, and identified which surface energies allowed insects to attach themselves. She has said that her doctorate taught her complex problem solving, and gave her the opportunity to teach classes on polymer science at Virginia Tech. She moved as a Lockheed Martin contractor to the Langley Research Center in 1990, where she worked on polymer characterization.

== Research and career ==
In 1998, Siochi joined the biomimetics research team at Langley. She was supported by the National Nanotechnology Initiative, initially reducing drag on aircraft singles through materials science. Siochi joined NASA in 2010. She led Langley's developed of structured nanomaterials for technological applications, including carbon nanotubes for nuclear thermal propulsion.

Siochi was elected to the NASA Technology Transfer Inventors Hall of Fame. In 2015, she was awarded the Outstanding Technical Contribution in Government Award in 2015.

== Selected publications ==
- G.M. Odegard; T.S. Gates; K.E. Wise; C. Park; E.J. Siochi (August 2003). "Constitutive modeling of nanotube–reinforced polymer composites". Composites Science and Technology. 63 (11): 1671–1687. Bibcode:2003ComST..63.1671O. doi:10.1016/s0266-3538(03)00063-0. ISSN 0266-3538. Wikidata Q117199358.
- Cheol Park; Zoubeida Ounaies; Kent A Watson; et al. (October 2002). "Dispersion of single wall carbon nanotubes by in situ polymerization under sonication". Chemical Physics Letters. 364 (3–4): 303–308. doi:10.1016/s0009-2614(02)01326-x. ISSN 0009-2614. Wikidata Q135682150.
- David S. McLachlan; Cosmas Chiteme; Cheol Park; Kristopher E. Wise; Sharon E. Lowther; Peter T. Lillehei; Emilie J. Siochi; Joycelyn S. Harrison (3 October 2005). "AC and DC percolative conductivity of single wall carbon nanotube polymer composites". Journal of Polymer Science Part B. 43 (22): 3273–3287. Bibcode:2005JPoSB..43.3273M. doi:10.1002/polb.20597. ISSN 0887-6266. Wikidata Q135928616.
