= Scapolite =

Group of rock-forming tectosilicate minerals

Scapolite group
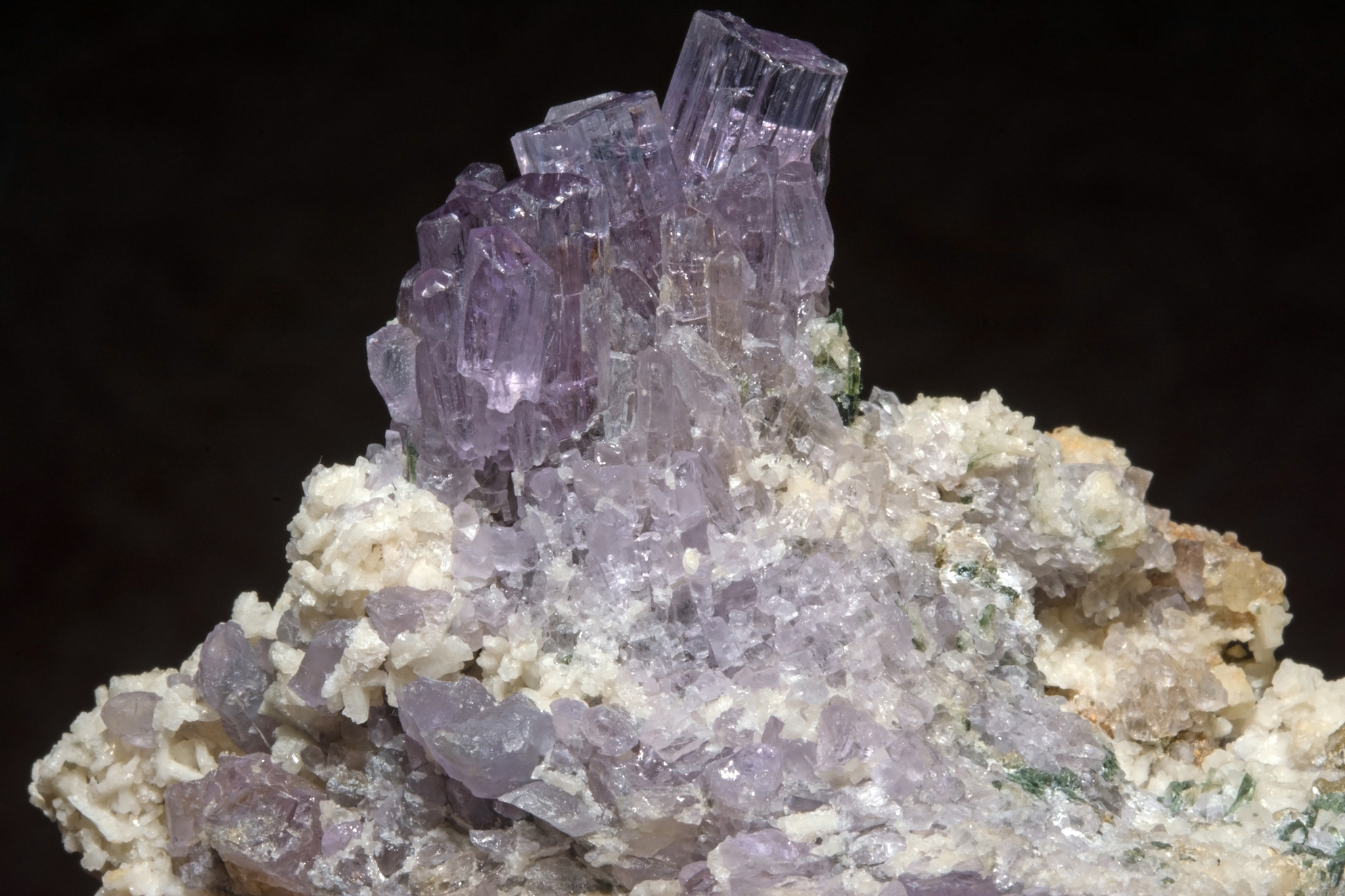

General
- Category: Tectosilicate minerals
- Group: Scapolite group
- IMA symbol: Scp
- Crystal system: Tetragonal

Identification
- Color: Pink, red, blue, brown, white, grey, colourless, green, yellow, orange, purple
- Cleavage: Good, in 2 directions
- Fracture: Conchoidal, uneven, brittle
- Mohs scale hardness: 5.5–6
- Luster: Vitreous
- Streak: White
- Diaphaneity: Opaque to transparent
- Specific gravity: 2.6–2.74
- Optical properties: Uniaxial (–)
- Refractive index: n_{ω} = 1.555–1.594 n_{ε} = 1.526–1.565
- Birefringence: 0.004–0.038
- Pleochroism: Moderate to strong
- Dispersion: 0.017
- Ultraviolet fluorescence: Inert to strong pink, orange and yellow

The scapolites (Greek: σκάπος, "rod", and λίθος, "stone") are a group of rock-forming silicate minerals composed of aluminium, calcium, and sodium silicate with chlorine, carbonate and sulfate. The two endmembers are meionite (Ca_{4}Al_{6}Si_{6}O_{24}CO_{3}) and marialite (Na_{4}Al_{3}Si_{9}O_{24}Cl). Silvialite (Ca,Na)_{4}Al_{6}Si_{6}O_{24}(SO_{4},CO_{3}) is also a recognized member of the group.

== Properties ==
Fluorescence of an intermediate member of the group

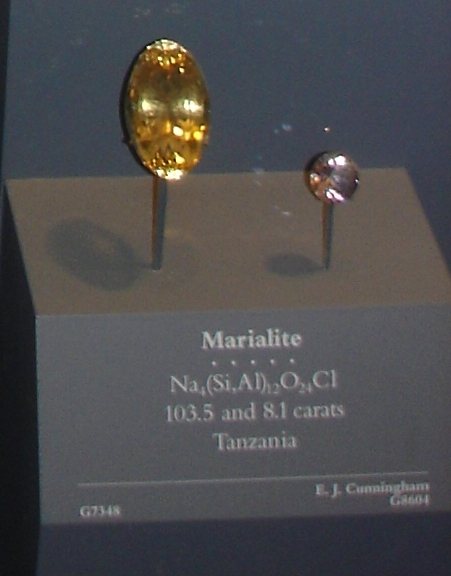
Marialite, a component of scapolite, from Tanzania at the National Museum of Natural History

The group is an isomorphous mixture of the meionite and marialite endmembers. The tetragonal crystals are hemihedral with parallel faces (like scheelite), and at times of considerable size. They are distinct and usually have the form of square columns, some cleavages parallel to the prism-faces. Crystals are usually white or greyish-white and opaque, though meionite is found as colorless glassy crystals in the ejected limestone blocks of Monte Somma, Vesuvius. The hardness is 5–6, and the specific gravity varies with the chemical composition between 2.7 (meionite) and 2.5 (marialite). The scapolites are especially liable to alteration by weathering processes, with the development of mica, kaolin, etc., and this is the cause of the usual opacity of the crystals. Owing to this alteration, and to the variations in composition, numerous varieties have been distinguished by special names. Scapolite is commonly a mineral of metamorphic origin, occurring usually in crystalline marbles, but also with pyroxene in schists and gneisses. The long slender prisms abundant in the crystalline marbles and schists in the Pyrenees are known as dipyre or couzeranite. Large crystals of common scapolite (wernerite) are found in the apatite deposits in the neighborhood of Bamble near Brevik in Norway, and have resulted from the alteration of the plagioclase of a gabbro.

== Scapolite-bearing rocks ==
According to their genesis the scapolite rocks fall naturally into four groups.

=== Limestones and contact metamorphic rocks ===
The scapolite limestones and contact metamorphic rocks. As silicates rich in calcium, it is to be expected that these minerals will be found where impure limestones have been crystallized by contact with an igneous magma. Even marialite (the variety richest in soda) occurs in this association, being principally obtained in small crystals lining cavities in ejected blocks of crystalline limestone at Vesuvius and the craters of the Eifel in Germany. Scapolite and wernerite are far more common at the contacts of limestone with intrusive masses. The minerals that accompany them are calcite, epidote, vesuvianite, garnet, wollastonite, diopside and amphibole. The scapolites are colorless, flesh-colored, grey or greenish; occasionally they are nearly black from the presence of very small enclosures of graphitic material. They are not in very perfect crystals, though sometimes incomplete octagonal sections are visible; the tetragonal cleavage, strong double refraction and uniaxial interference figure distinguish them readily from other minerals. Commonly they weather to micaceous aggregate, but sometimes an isotropic substance of unknown nature is seen replacing them. In crystalline limestones and calc–silicate rocks they occur in small and usually inconspicuous grains mingled with the other components of the rock. Large, nearly idiomorphic crystals are sometimes found in argillaceous rocks (altered calcareous shales) that have suffered thermal metamorphism. In the Pyrenees there are extensive outcrops of limestone penetrated by igneous rocks described as ophites (varieties of diabase) and lherzolites (peridotites). At the contacts scapolite occurs in a great number of places, both in the limestones and in the calcareous shales that accompany them. In some of these rocks large crystals of one of the scapolite minerals (an inch or two in length) occur, usually as octagonal prisms with imperfect terminations. In others the mineral is found in small irregular grains. It is sometimes clear, but often crowded with minute enclosures of augite, tourmaline, biotite and other minerals, such as constitute the surrounding matrix. From these districts also a black variety is well known, filled with minute graphitic enclosures, often exceedingly small and rendering the mineral nearly opaque. The names couzeranite and dipyre are often given to this kind of scapolite. Apparently the presence of chlorine in small quantities, which may often be detected in limestones, to some extent determines the formation of the mineral.

=== Mafic igneous rocks ===
In many mafic igneous rocks, such as gabbro and diabase, scapolite replaces feldspar by a secondary or metasomatic process. Some Norwegian scapolite-gabbros (or diorite) examined microscopically furnish examples of every stage of the process. The chemical changes involved are really small, one of the most important being the assumption of a small amount of chlorine in the new molecule. Often the scapolite is seen spreading through the feldspar, portions being completely replaced, while others are still fresh and unaltered. The feldspar does not weather, but remains fresh, and the transformation resembles metamorphism rather than weathering. It is not a superficial process, but apparently takes place at some depth under pressure, and probably through the operation of solutions or vapours containing chlorides. The basic soda-lime feldspars (labradorite to anorthite) are those that undergo this type of alteration. Many instances of scapolitization have been described from the ophites (diabases) of the Pyrenees. In the unaltered state these are ophitic and consist of pyroxene enclosing lath-shaped plagioclase feldspars; the pyroxene is often changed to uralite. When the feldspar is replaced by scapolite the new mineral is fresh and clear, enclosing often small grains of hornblende. Extensive recrystallization often goes on, and the ultimate product is a spotted rock with white rounded patches of scapolite surrounded by granular aggregates of clear green hornblende: in fact the original structure disappears.

=== Scapolite-hornblende rocks ===
In Norway scapolite-hornblende rocks have long been known at Ødegården and other localities. They have been called spotted gabbros, but usually do not contain feldspar, the white spots being entirely scapolite while the dark matrix enveloping them is an aggregate of green or brownish hornblende. In many features they bear a close resemblance to the scapolitized ophites of the Pyrenees. It has been suggested that the conversion of their original feldspar (for there can be no doubt that they were once gabbros, consisting of plagioclase and pyroxene) into scapolite is due to the percolation of chloride solutions along lines of weakness, or planes of solubility, filling cavities etched in the substance of the mineral. Subsequently the chlorides were absorbed, and the feldspar was transformed into scapolite. But it is found that in these gabbros there are veins of a chlorine-bearing apatite, which must have been deposited by gases or fluids ascending from below. This suggests that a pneumatolytic process has been at work, similar to that by which, around intrusions of granite, veins rich in tourmaline have been formed, and the surrounding rocks at the same time permeated by that mineral. In the composition of the active gases a striking difference is shown, for those that emanate from the granites are mainly fluorine and boron, while those from the gabbro are principally chlorine and phosphorus. In one case the feldspar is replaced by quartz and white mica (in greisen) or quartz and tourmaline (in schorl rocks); in the other case scapolite is the principal new product. The analogy is a very close one, and this theory receives much support from the fact that in Canada (at various places in Ottawa and Ontario) there are numerous valuable apatite vein deposits. They lie in basic rocks such as gabbro and pyroxenite, and these in the neighborhood of the veins have been extensively scapolitized, like the spotted gabbros of Norway.

=== Metamorphic rocks of gneissose character ===
In many parts of the world metamorphic rocks of gneissose character occur containing scapolite as an essential constituent. Their origin is often obscure, but it is probable that they are of two kinds. One series is essentially igneous (orthogneisses); usually they contain pale green pyroxene, a variable amount of feldspar, sphene, and iron oxides. Quartz, rutile, green hornblende and biotite are often present, while garnet occurs sometimes; hypersthene is rare. They occur along with other types of pyroxene gneiss, hornblende gneiss, amphibolites, etc. In many of them there is no reason to doubt that the scapolite is a primary mineral. Other scapolite gneisses equally metamorphic in aspect and structure appear to be sedimentary rocks. Many of them contain calcite or are very rich in calc-silicates (wollastonite, diopside, etc.), which suggests that they were originally impure limestones. The frequent association of this type with graphitic-schists and andalusite-schists makes this correlation in every way probable. Biotite is a common mineral in these rocks, which often contain also much quartz and alkali feldspar.
