= JunoCam =

Public engagement camera aboard a Jupiter orbiter

JunoCam (or JCM) is the visible-light camera/telescope onboard NASA's Juno spacecraft that entered orbit around Jupiter in 2016. The camera is operated by the JunoCam Digital Electronics Assembly (JDEA). Both the camera and JDEA were built by Malin Space Science Systems. JunoCam takes a swath of imaging as the spacecraft rotates; the camera is fixed to the spacecraft, so as it rotates, it gets one sweep of observation. It has a field of view of 58 degrees with four filters (3 for visible light).

== Planned goals and outcome ==
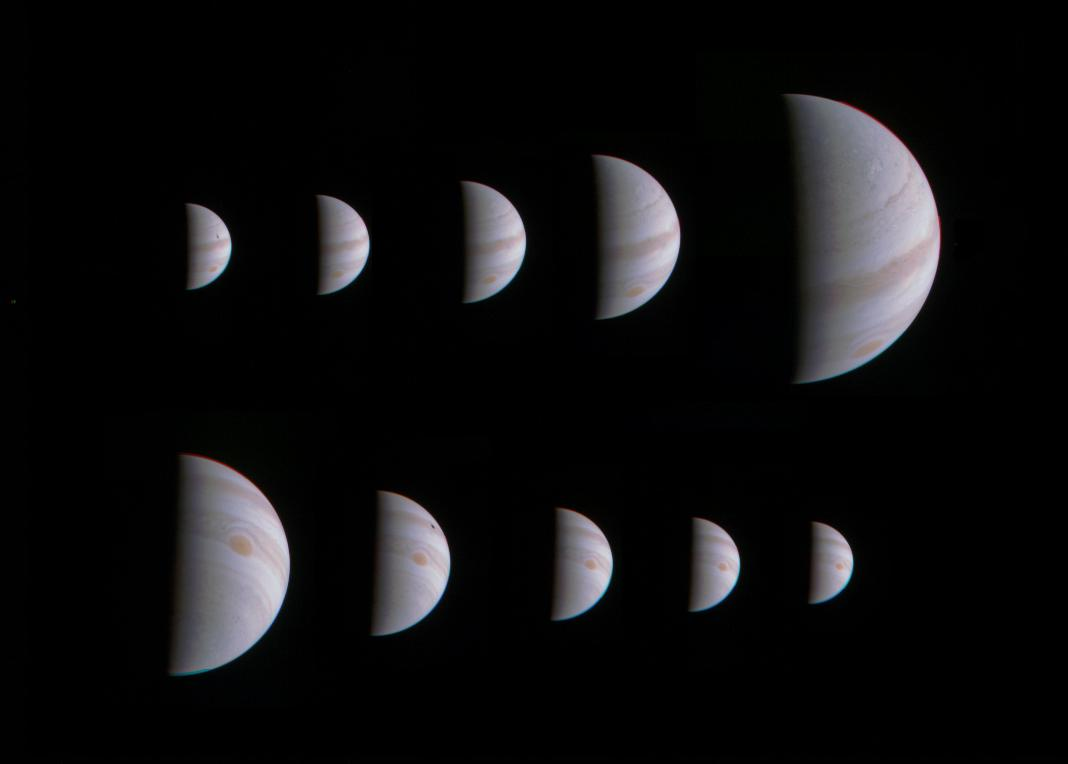
JunoCam views of Jupiter, August 2016

Originally, due to telecommunications constraints, Juno was expected to only be able to return about 40 megabytes of camera data during each 11-day orbital period (the orbital period was later modified). The downlink average data rate of around 325 bits per second will limit the number of images that are captured and transmitted during each orbit to somewhere between 10 and 100 depending on the compression level used. This is comparable to the previous Galileo mission that orbited Jupiter, which captured thousands of images despite its slow data rate of 1000 bits per second (at maximum compression levels) due to antenna problems that prevented operation with its planned 135,000 bit-per-second communications link.

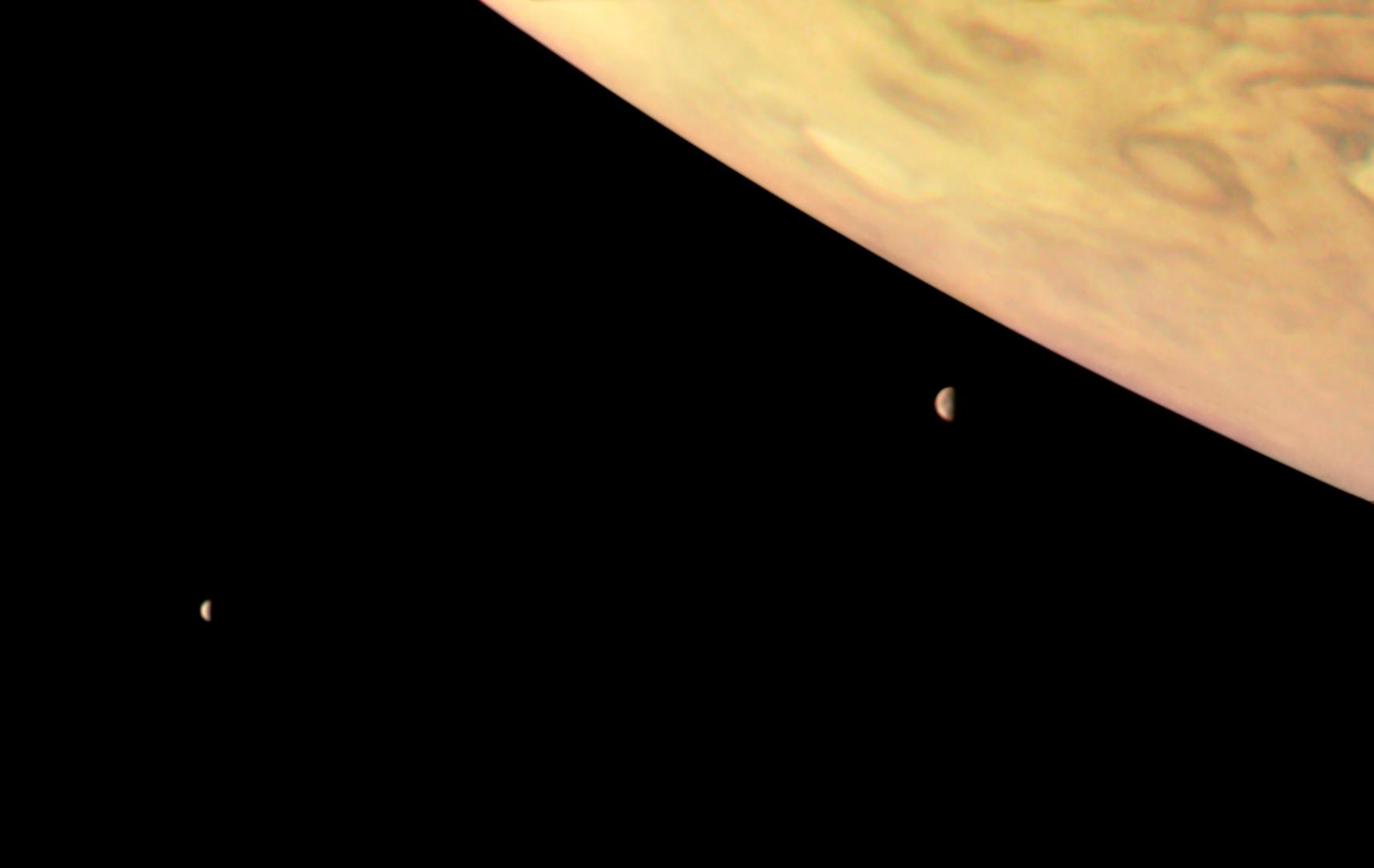
Io and Europa with Jupiter

The primary observation target is Jupiter itself, although limited images of some of Jupiter's moons have been taken and more are intended. JunoCam successfully returned detailed images of Ganymede after Juno's flyby on June 7, 2021, with further flybys of Europa on September 29, 2022, and two of Io on December 30, 2023 and February 3, 2024. These flybys also reduced Juno's orbital period to 33 days.

The JunoCam project was coordinated by Glenn Orton and is led by Candice Hansen-Koharcheck. JunoCam is not one of the probe's core scientific instruments; it was put on board primarily for public science and outreach, to increase public engagement, with all images available on NASA's website. It is capable of being used for science, and does have some coordinated activities in regards to this, as well as to engage amateur and as well as professional infrared astronomers.

== Design ==
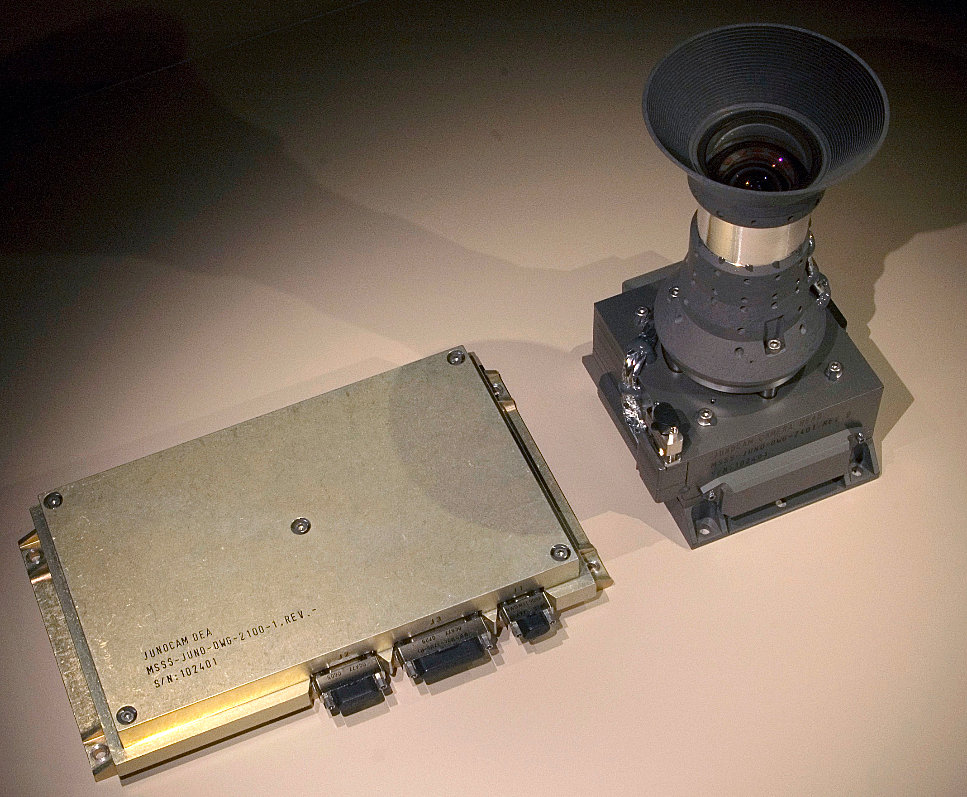
JunoCam hardware

The JunoCam physical and electronic interfaces are largely based on the MARDI instrument for the Mars Science Laboratory. However, the housing and some aspects of the camera's inner mechanism have been modified to provide stable operation in Jupiter's intense radiation environment and magnetic fields.

Part of its mission will be to provide close up views of Jupiter's polar region and lower-latitude cloud belts, and at Juno's intended orbit the camera is able to take images at up to 15 kilometres (9.3 mi) per pixel resolution. However, within one hour of closest approach to Jupiter it can take up to 3 kilometres (1.9 mi) pixel, thus exceeding the resolution of Cassini up to that time on Saturn.

In addition to visible light filters, it also has a near infrared filter to help detect clouds; a methane filter in addition the visible color filters. The camera is a "push-broom" type imager, generating an image as the spacecraft turns moving the sensor in sweeping motion over the observation area.

One of the constraints for JunoCam hardware was mass, which limited the size of the optics.

== Specifications and mission ==
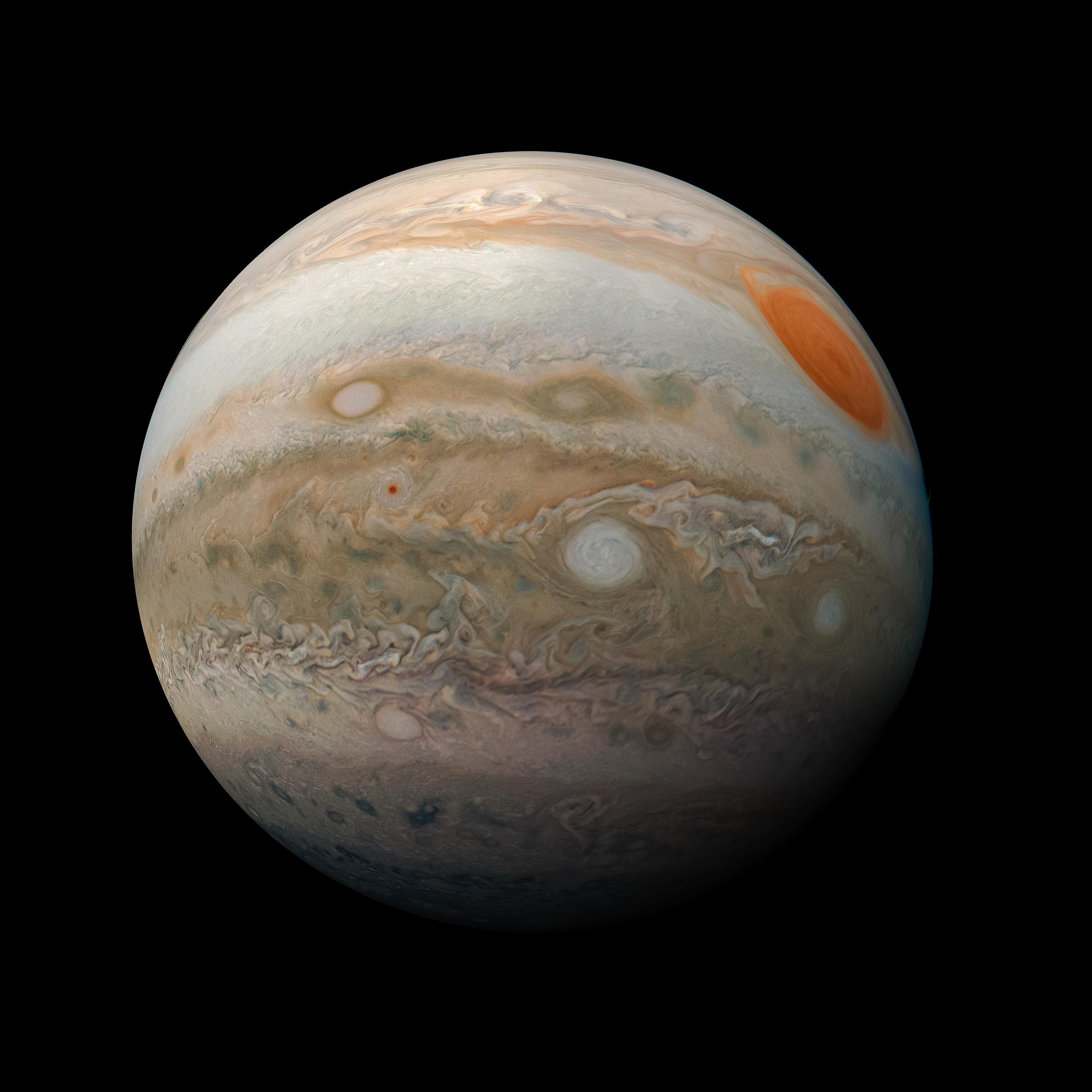
Published by NASA in March 2019, the "Jupiter Marble" image by Juno's JunoCam imager

The camera and the mission were not designed to study the moons of Jupiter. JunoCam has a field of view that is too wide to resolve any detail in the Jovian moons except during close flybys. Jupiter itself may only appear to be 75 pixels across from JunoCam when Juno reaches the furthest point of its orbit around the planet. At its closest approaches, JunoCam could achieve 15 km/pixel resolution from 4300 km, while Hubble has taken images of up to 119 km/pixel from 600 million km.

The camera uses a Kodak image sensor, the KODAK KAI-2020, capable of color imaging at 1600 x 1200 pixels: less than 2 megapixels. It has a field of view of 58 degrees with four filters (red, green, blue, and a methane band) to provide color imaging. The low resolution, rigid mounting, and lossy compression applied before transmission makes it effectively the Juno "dashcam".

Juno's orbit is highly elongated and takes it close to the poles (within 4,300 kilometres (2,700 mi)), but then far beyond Callisto's orbit, the most distant Galilean moon. This orbital design helps the spacecraft (and its complement of scientific instruments) avoid Jupiter's radiation belts, which have a record of damaging spacecraft electronics and solar panels. The Juno Radiation Vault with its titanium walls also aids in protecting and shielding Juno's electronics. Despite the intense magnetosphere of Jupiter, JunoCam was expected to be operational for at least the first eight orbits (September 2017), but as of December 2023 (57 orbits) remains active and has also been re-purposed from an outreach-only camera to a scientific instrument to study the dynamics of Jupiter's clouds, polar storms, and moons. The camera sensor experienced noticeable damage from radiation during the 56th orbit in late 2023, increasing noise in the resulting images. However, there is still enough detail to produce sharp imagery through more intensive processing.

== Additional camera proposal ==
In 2005 the Italian Space Agency (ASI) proposed an additional visible light instrument "ItaCam", but instead they built a near-infrared camera/spectrometer, the Jovian Infrared Auroral Mapper (JIRAM) and a Ka-band transponder. ASI previously contributed a near-infrared instrument to the Cassini–Huygens Saturn probe. The Ka-band instrument, KaTS, is a component of the Gravity Science experiment.

== Gallery ==
Earth

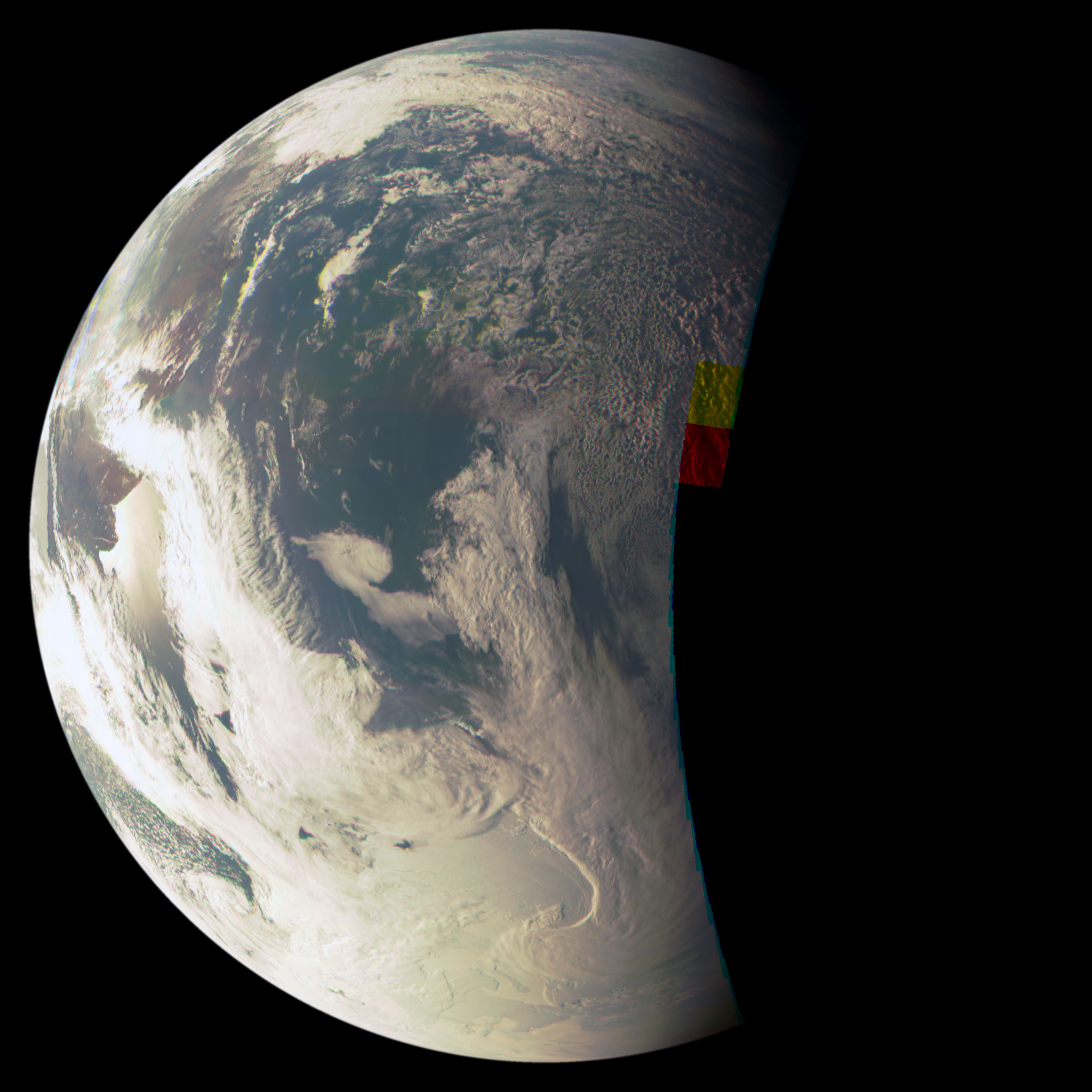
A color view of Earth assembled from 82 images as the spacecraft spun, at an altitude of 1,987 miles (3,197 kilometers), 10 minutes before closest approach

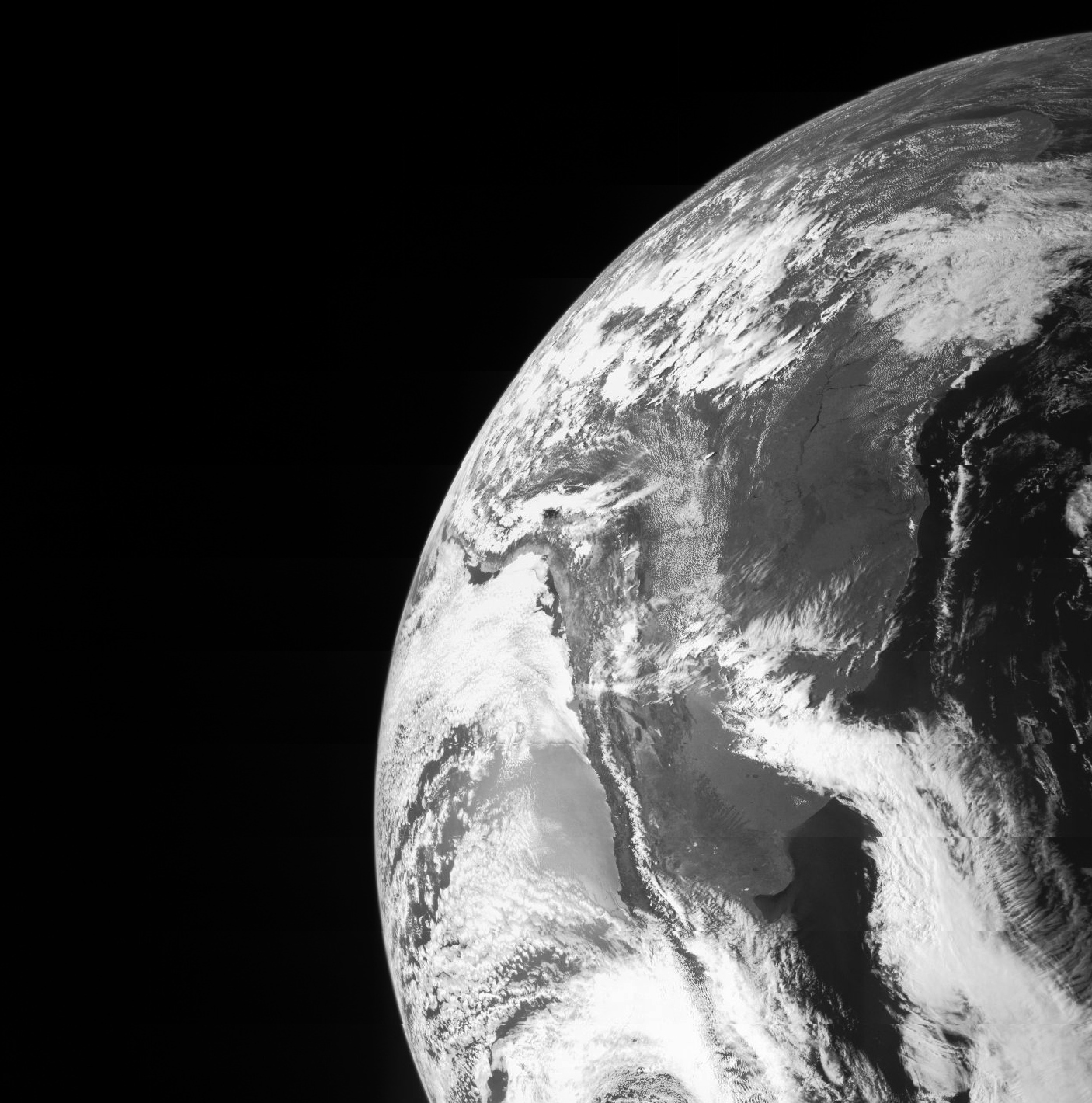
JunoCam views Earth (centered on South America) in October 2013 during the spacecraft's flyby en route to Jupiter

Jupiter system

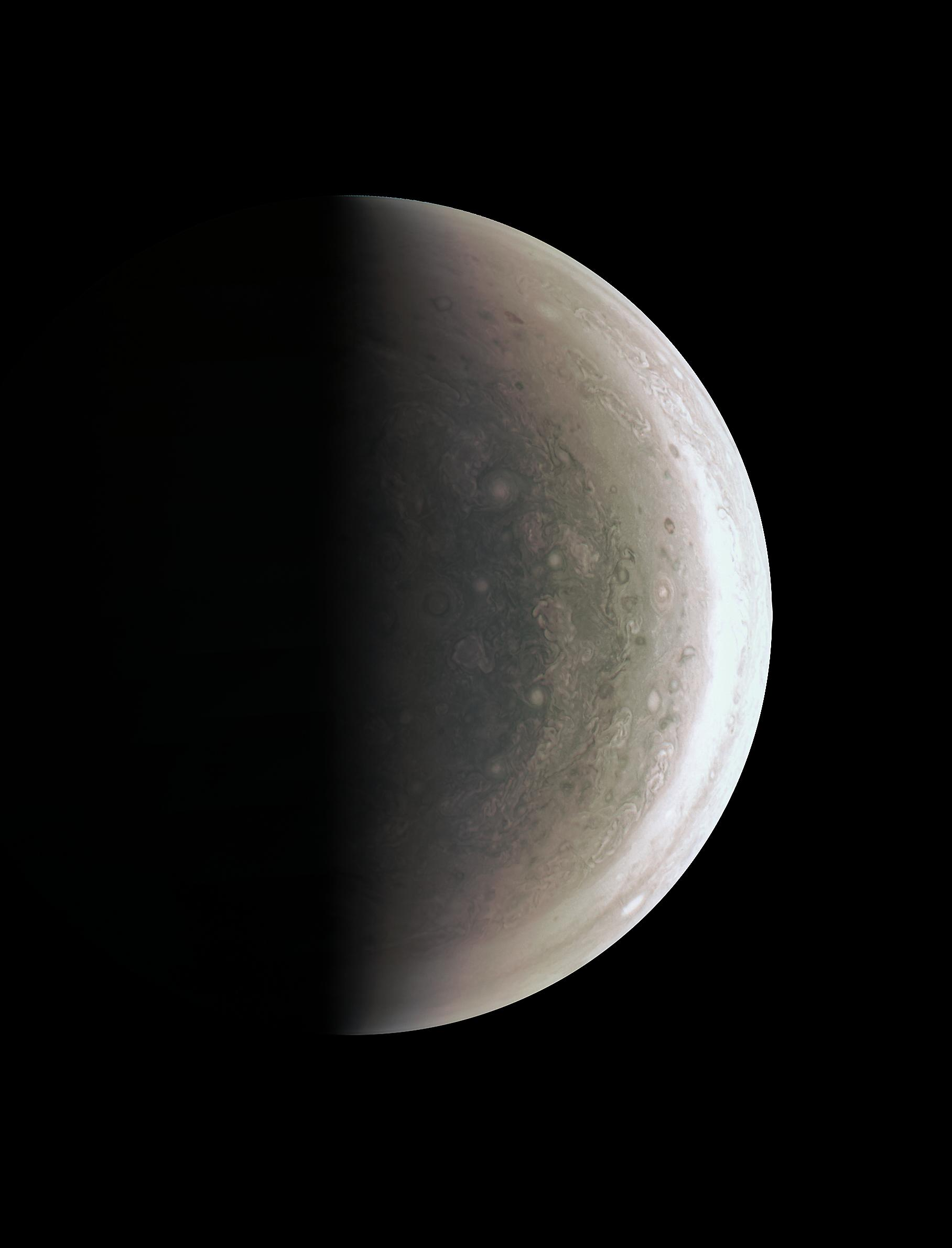
Jupiter's polar region captured by JunoCam.

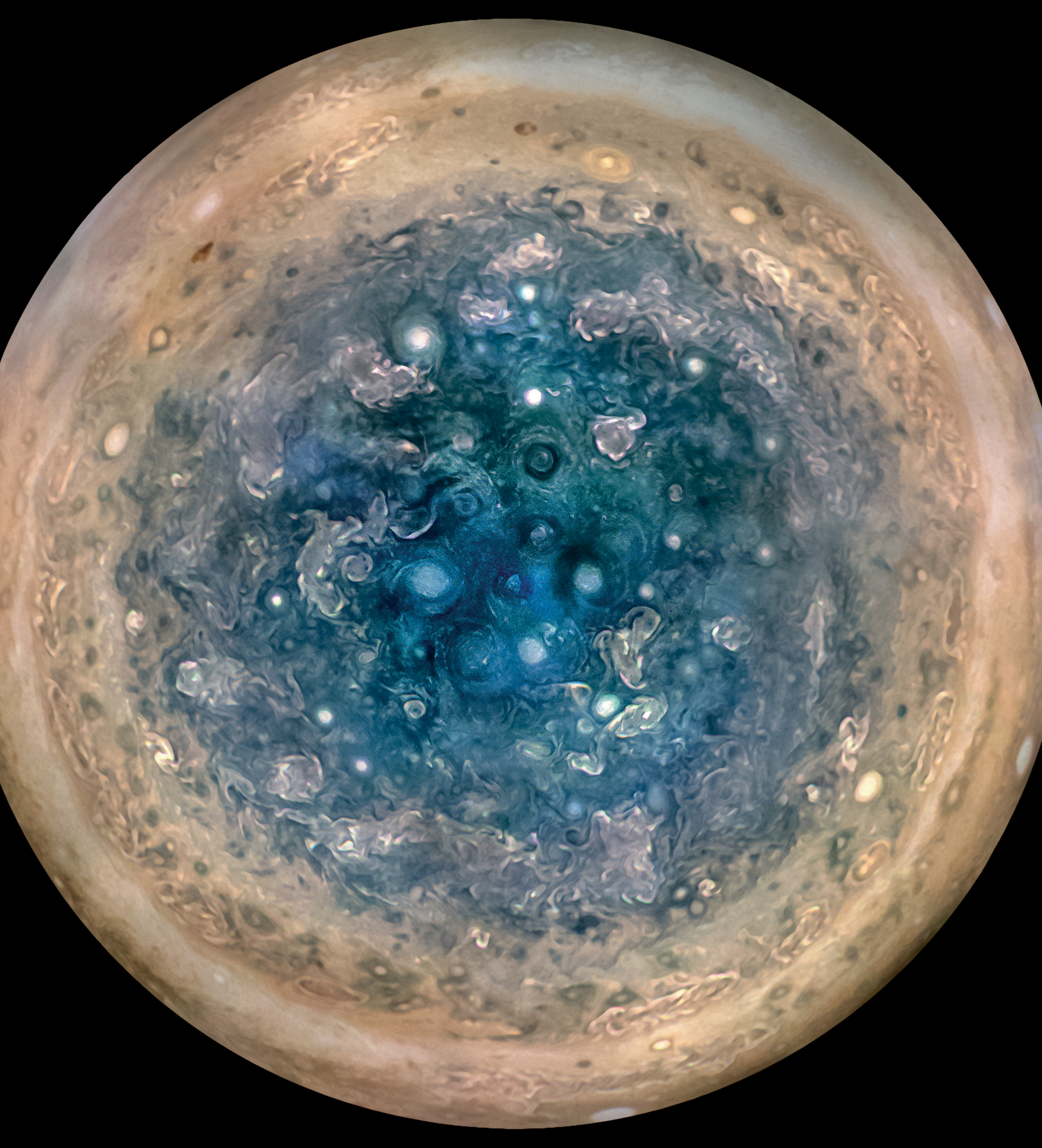
Jupiter – southern storms – viewed by JunoCam.

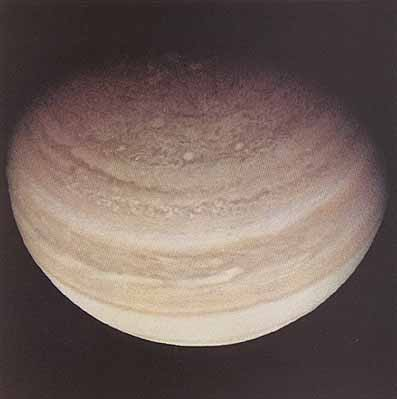
Jupiter's polar region in 1974 during Pioneer 11's gravity assist to Saturn. (Historical background for Jupiter imaging)

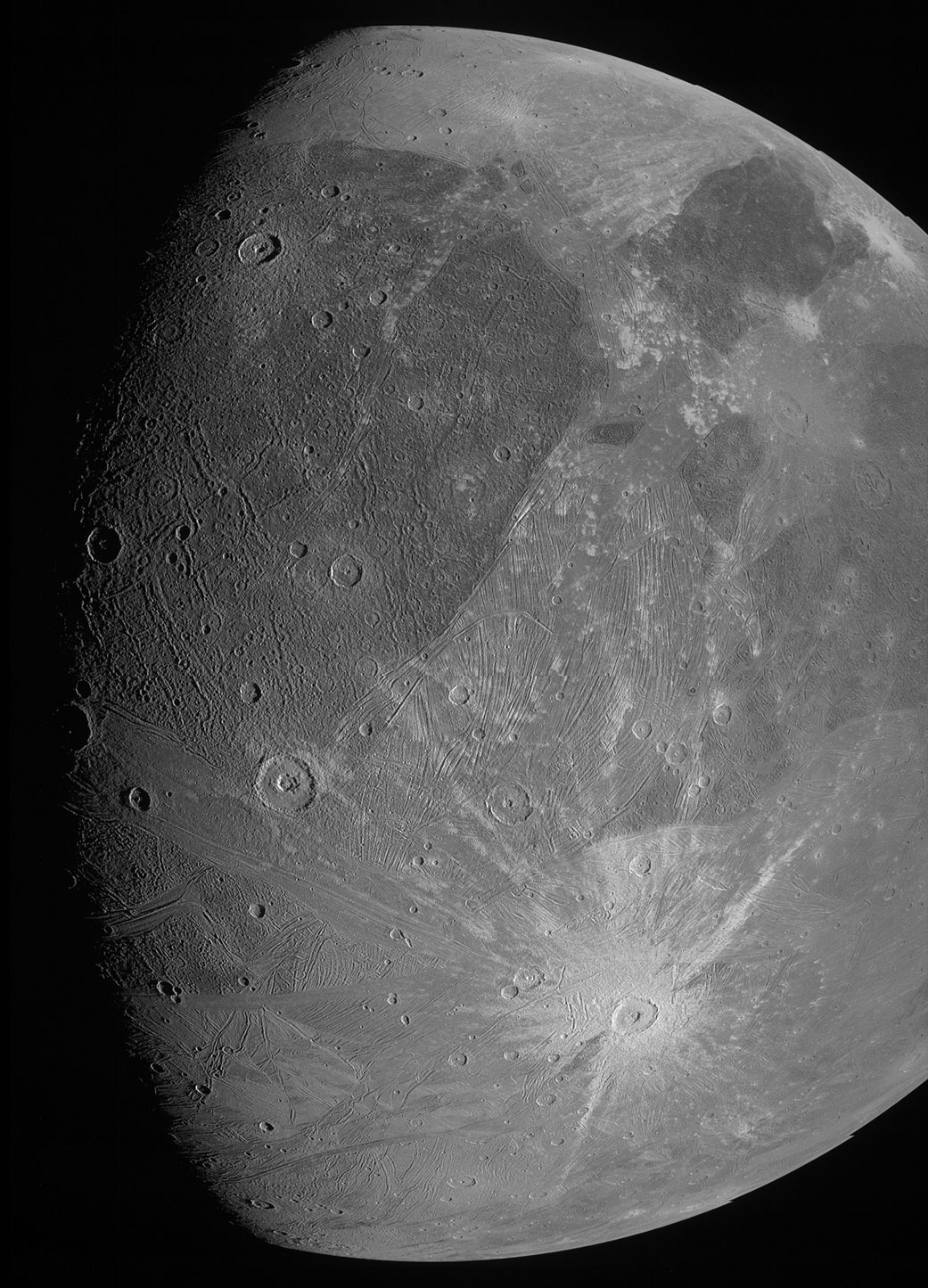
Ganymede, photographed on 7 June 2021 by Juno during its extended mission

Io, moon

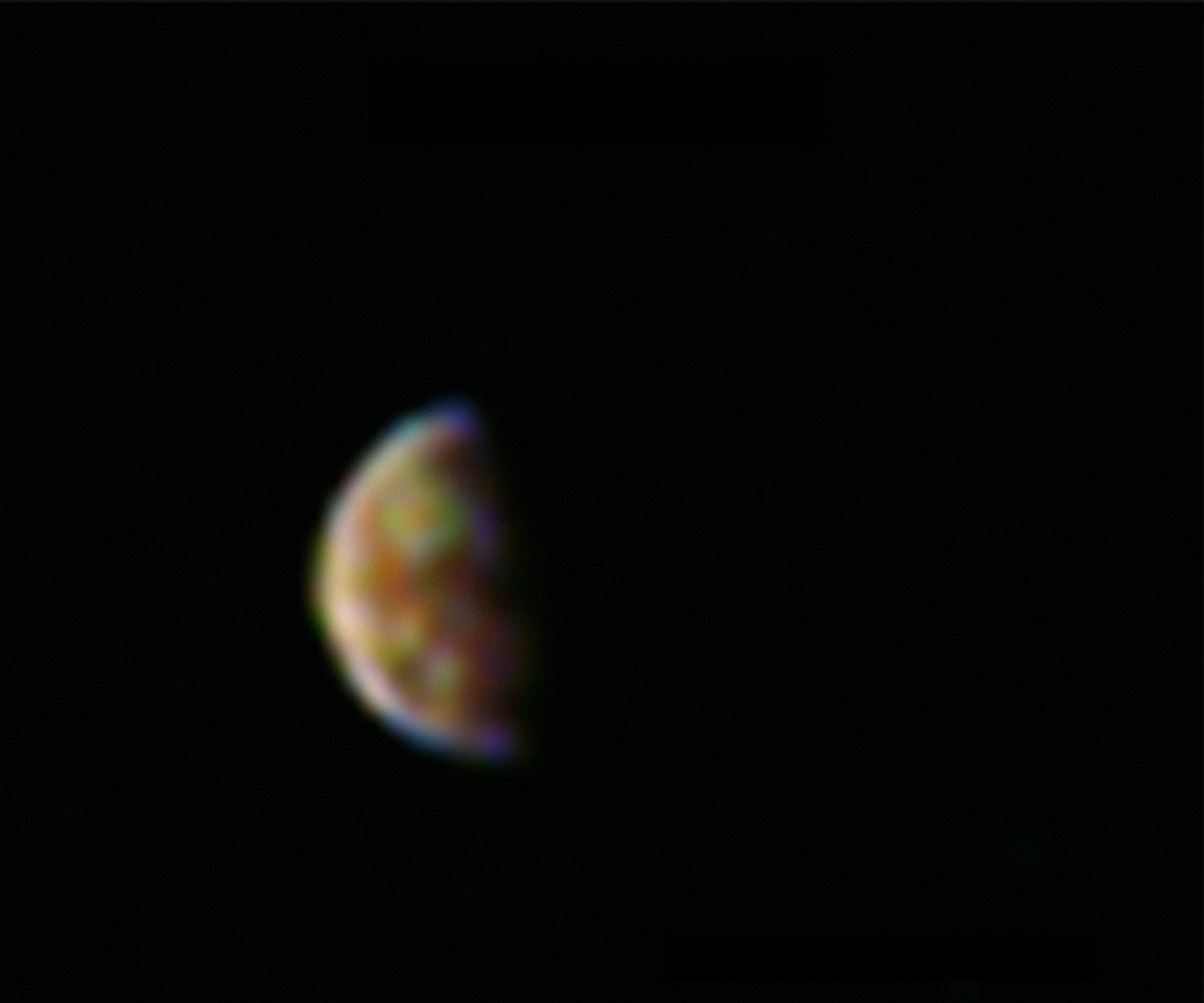
Io, as recorded by JunoCam
(2 September 2017)

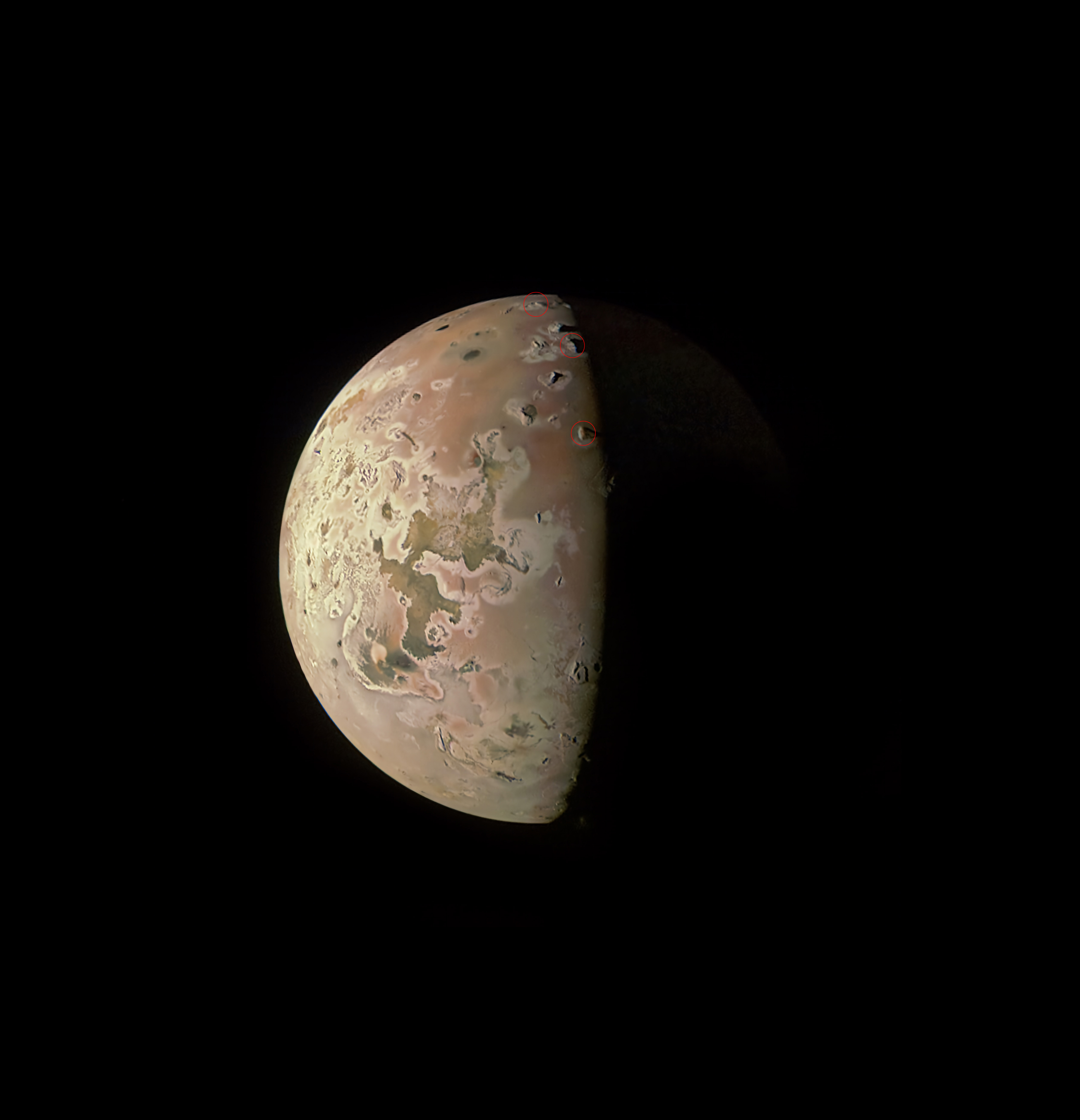
Io, viewed by JunoCam
(15 October 2023)
Several Volcanos

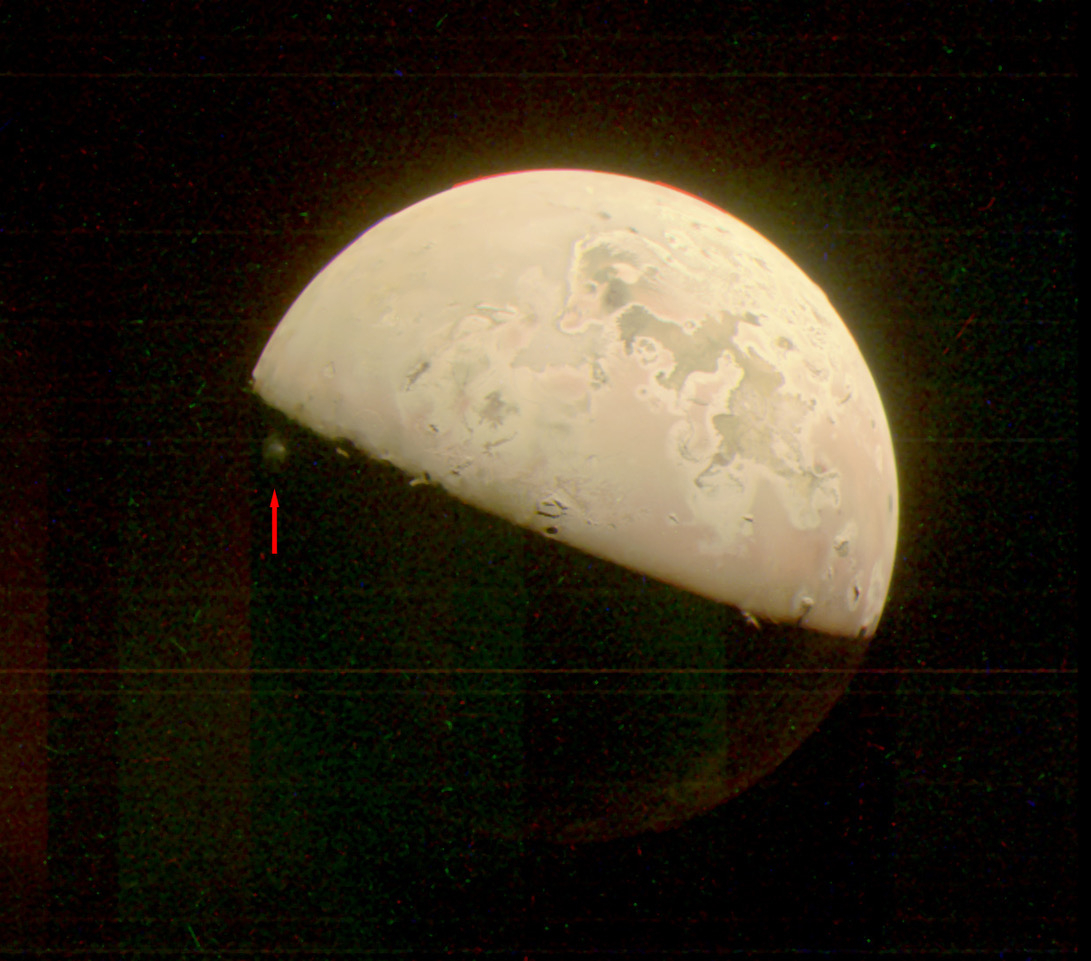
Io, viewed by JunoCam
(15 October 2023)
Volcanic plume

== See also ==
- Citizen science
- Galileo (spacecraft), NASA space probe to Jupiter 1989–2003.

Other cameras manufactured by Malin Space Science Systems:

- Context (CTX) Camera also for the MRO spacecraft
- Mars Color Imager for the Mars Reconnaissance Orbiter (MRO)
- Mars Orbiter Camera

Other Juno instruments:

- JEDI
- Jovian Auroral Distributions Experiment (JADE)
- Jovian Infrared Auroral Mapper (JIRAM)
- Magnetometer (Juno) (MAG)
