= Meionite =

Calcium endmember in the scapolite group of tectoslicate minerals

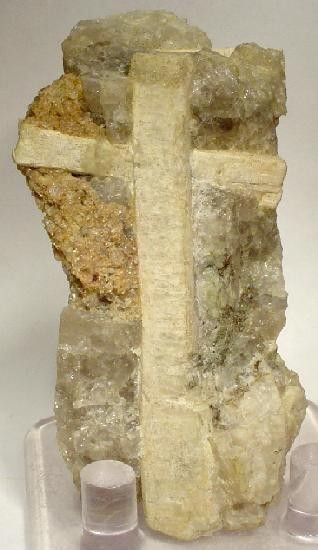
- Meionite (scapolite) crystals (cross-shaped) in a quartz matrix, 7.2 × 4.0 × 3.0 cm. Worcester County, Massachusetts.

General
- Category: Tectosilicate minerals
- Group: Scapolite group
- Formula: Ca_{4}Al_{6}Si_{6}O_{24}CO_{3}
- IMA symbol: Me
- Strunz classification: 9.FB.15
- Crystal system: Tetragonal
- Crystal class: Dipyramidal (4/m) (same H-M symbol)
- Space group: I4/m
- Unit cell: a = 12.179(1) Å, c = 7.571(1) Å, Z = 2

Identification
- Color: Colorless, white, grey, pink, violet, blue, yellow, orange-brown, brown
- Cleavage: Distinct/good on {100}{110}
- Fracture: Irregular/uneven, conchoidal
- Tenacity: Brittle
- Mohs scale hardness: 5–6
- Luster: Vitreous, resinous, pearly
- Streak: White
- Diaphaneity: Transparent, opaque
- Specific gravity: 2.74–2.78
- Optical properties: Uniaxial (−)
- Refractive index: 1.556 to 1.600
- Birefringence: 0.024 to 0.037

Meionite is a tectosilicate belonging to the scapolite group with the formula Ca_{4}Al_{6}Si_{6}O_{24}CO_{3}. Some samples may also contain a sulfate group. It was first discovered in 1801 on Mt Somma, Vesuvius, Italy. It was named by Rene Just Haüy after μειωυ, the Greek word for less, in reference to the less acute pyramidal form as compared to vesuvianite.

As an end-member of the scapolite solid solution, meionite has the largest cell dimension and very high thermal stability at high pressures. This indicates that meionite is one of the primary minerals in deep seated basic or intermediate magmatic processes. Meionite also breaks down to grossularite + kyanite + quartz + calcite at high pressure, similar to the upper pressure limits of anorthite. This sets its occurrence to the crustal rocks.
