= NASA Outstanding Public Leadership Medal =

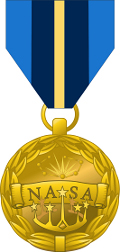
- NASA Outstanding Public Leadership Medal
- Type: Medal
- Country: United states
- Presented by: the National Aeronautics and Space Administration
- Eligibility: non-Government individuals only
- Status: Active
- Established: 2012
- NASA Outstanding Public Leadership Ribbon

Precedence
- Next (higher): Outstanding Leadership Medal
- Next (lower): Exceptional Service Medal

The NASA Outstanding Public Leadership Medal is awarded to individuals who were not Government employees during the period in which the accomplishment was achieved, "for notable leadership accomplishments that have significantly influenced the NASA Mission."

"Sustained leadership and exceptionally high-impact leadership achievements should demonstrate the individual's effectiveness in advancing the Agency's goals and image in present and future terms."

The leadership excellence must be demonstrated in all of the following areas:

- Achieving Results--Highly effective in achieving positive results/change. Impact and importance of work achievements toward NASA's missions and image are a direct result of the individual's contributions and efforts.
- Role Model--Consistent and exemplary behavior that models NASA's core values and promotes these values within the Agency.
- Leading People--Cooperative collaboration and teamwork across the organizational, directorate, Agency, Government or industry level to accomplish expected results;
- Influencing Change--Innovative approaches used in the conception, design, or execution of projects, programs, initiatives, and activities (work represents a high degree of creativity or fundamental departure from usual practice).

== Recipients ==
=== 2020 ===
- Philip O. Brown

== See also ==
- List of NASA awards
