= Climate of Triton =

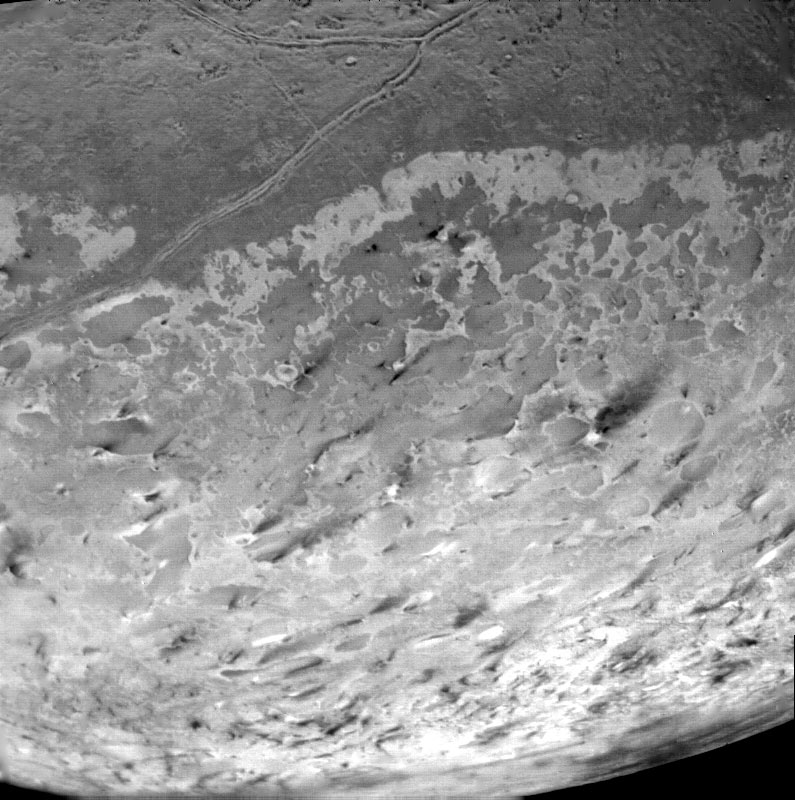
Triton's southern polar cap and dark plume streaks

The climate of Triton encompasses the atmospheric dynamics, weather, and long-term atmospheric trends of Neptune's moon Triton. The atmosphere of Triton is rather thin, with a surface pressure of only 1.4 Pa (1.38×10^{−5} atm) at the time of Voyager 2's flyby, but heavily variable. Despite its low surface pressure, it still drives active and global weather and climate cycles, heavily influencing Triton's glacial activity.

Triton's climate is dominated by extreme seasonal fluctuations that induce global volatile transport between its polar caps, leading to variable atmospheric circulation. The atmosphere of Triton also supports the formation of thin atmospheric haze and clouds, both of which remain poorly studied. While Triton's climate is similar to the climate of Pluto, important differences separate the two, such as Triton's more chaotic climate cycles and colder atmosphere.

== Atmospheric properties ==
Triton's atmosphere possesses a mean surface pressure of roughly 1.4 Pa, or roughly 1/70,000 that of Earth's sea level pressure. The mean surface pressure varies significantly with respect to Triton's seasons; by 1997, Triton's atmospheric surface pressure had risen to approximately 1.9^{+0.18}_{−0.15} Pa and the surface pressure may have reached a maximum of roughly 4 Pa by 2010 (though there were no direct measurements via occultation between 2007 and 2017). Nevertheless, by 2022 the surface pressure dropped back to 1.454 ± 0.047 Pa, nearly exactly what Voyager 2 recorded in 1989. Triton's atmosphere is composed mainly of nitrogen (~99%), with minor contributions from other compounds such as methane (~0.02%) and carbon monoxide (~0.01%), similar to the atmosphere of Pluto and, to an extent, the atmosphere of Titan.

=== Temperature ===
Measurements of Triton's surface temperature by Voyager 2 range between 34 and 44K (−239 and −229 °C), with an extrapolated surface temperature of 37.5K (−235.7 °C) based on an atmospheric thermal profile. These measurements are consistent with the observed atmospheric surface pressure of ~1.4 Pa by Voyager 2, which is close to nitrogen's vapor pressure at 37.5K. Over the decade following the Voyager 2 flyby, Triton's surface temperature increased to 39.3K (−233.9 °C) by 1997.

== Atmospheric phenomena ==
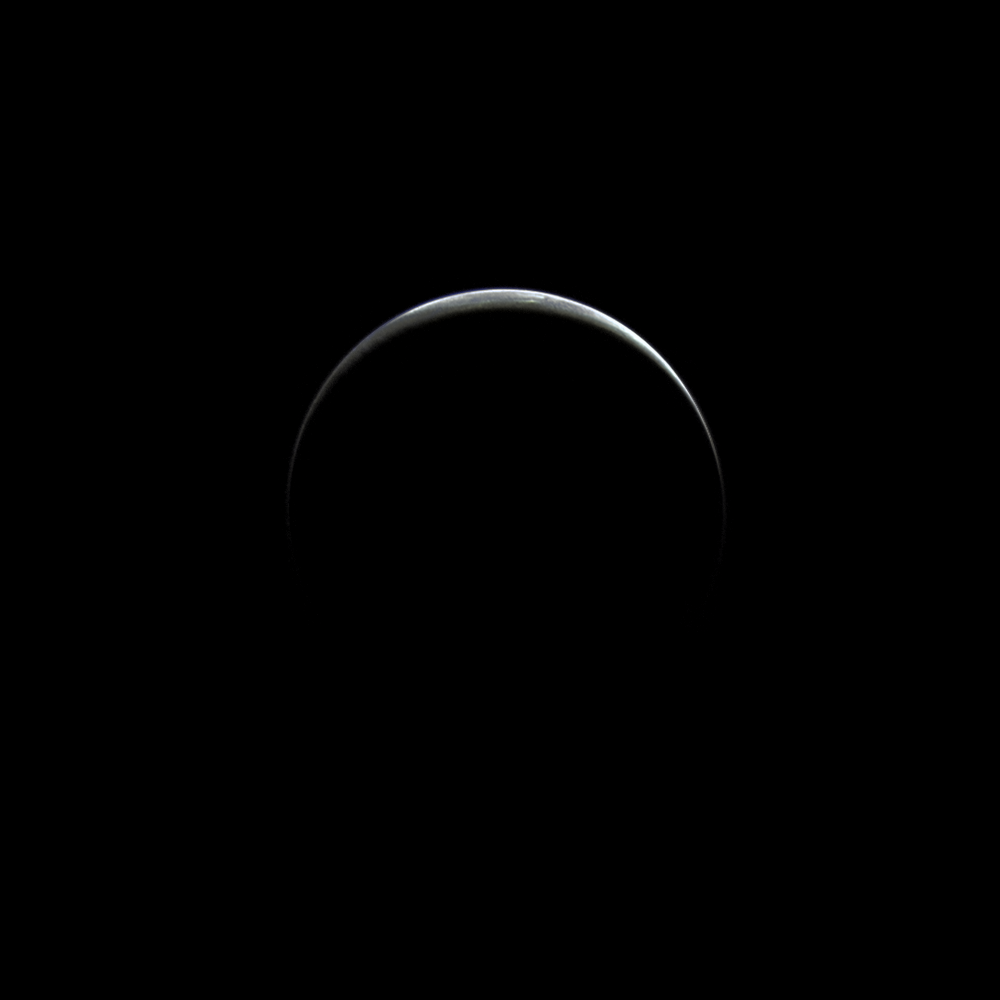
Departure image of Triton and its atmosphere, with haze lit up by sunlight faintly visible just over Triton's surface

Despite the thin and heavily variable atmospheric surface pressure, Triton's atmosphere hosts a variety of global phenomena. Triton appears to host a distinct troposphere, which may be thermally defined by the atmosphere's vertical temperature profile. Alternatively, Triton's lower atmosphere may be dynamically defined by wind shear.

=== Winds and circulation ===
Most information about Triton's winds come from the numerous dark streaks which mark its southern polar cap that appear to follow prevailing winds in the region. Over 100 of these streaks have been observed, with most extending to the northeast from narrow points—presumably their points of origin. Two active plumes, the Hili and Mahilani Plumes, were also observed; the plume columns abruptly streak westward at an altitude of roughly 8 km, possibly marking Triton's tropopause. The direction of the plume streaks may indicate anticyclonic circulation around Triton's south pole, with winds blowing within an Ekman layer where wind direction is governed by a balance of the pressure gradient force, Coriolis force, and drag. A temperature gradient drives a thermal wind which eventually weakens eastwards winds before reversing direction with increasing altitude. The observations of the active plume columns show that Triton's atmosphere is capable of wind-driven material transport, but the speed of Triton's winds are poorly constrained. Early estimates shortly after the Voyager 2 flyby estimated westerly wind speeds of 5–15 m/s near Triton's south pole, but subsequent modelling resulted in much weaker westerly winds of < 0.5 m/s.

Triton's atmospheric circulation is dominated by the sublimation and deposition of nitrogen. Models of Triton's global circulation during its southern hemisphere summer, where nitrogen sublimates from the southern polar cap and deposits on the northern polar cap, result in a general south-to-north flow. The Coriolis force deflects these winds, leading to retrograde winds that blow up to 10 m/s above Triton's equator. However, the apparent reversal of wind direction ~8 km above Triton's south polar cap, as indicated by the plumes observed by Voyager 2, remains largely unexplained.

=== Clouds ===
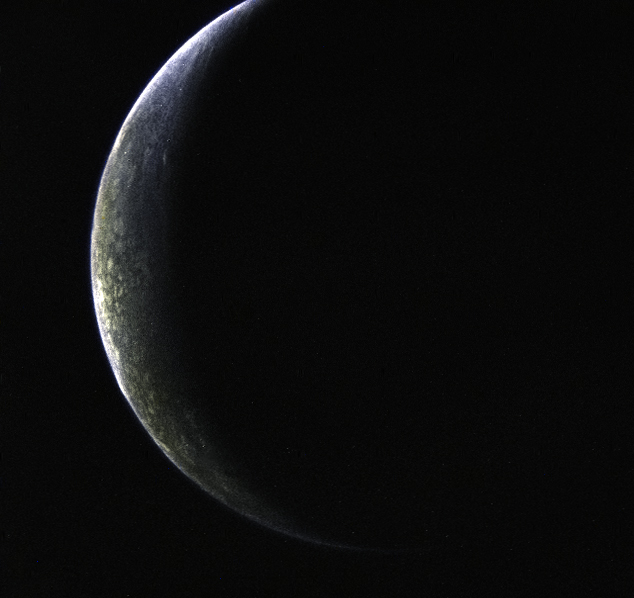
A departing image of Triton's crescent. Several clouds can be seen along Triton's terminator as fuzzy bright streaks, particularly at the top of the image

Images of Triton's limb and terminator by Voyager 2 discovered multiple thin, bright clouds. The thin clouds on Triton are likely composed of condensed nitrogen crystals suspended in Triton's atmosphere. The clouds have an optical depth of roughly 0.063 in the violet range (0.41 μm), with some clouds being significant enough to obscure parts of Triton's surface. Distinct, east-to-west crescent-shaped clouds roughly 10 km wide and hundreds of kilometers long were observed beyond Triton's terminator, with the clouds estimated to be 1–3 kilometers above the surface. Up to one-third of Triton's limb near its southern regions were covered by clouds.

=== Haze ===
As with the atmospheres of Pluto and Titan, Triton's atmosphere supports layers of organic atmospheric haze. The haze is sparse; Triton's atmosphere is about as hazy as the Martian atmosphere when there are no dust storms are in progress. The haze primarily occurs in Triton's lower atmosphere, extending up to ~30 km above Triton's surface, though possibly extending further, due to Voyager 2's detection limitations. The haze is likely formed by the action of ultraviolet light on atmospheric methane and nitrogen, and may be influenced by the presence of carbon monoxide the condensation of hydrocarbon ice. The resulting material aggregates into particles about 100–200 nm in size, largely composed of a variety of hydrocarbons and nitriles termed tholins. Despite the broad similarities between the atmospheres of Triton and Pluto in composition and pressure, models of haze formation indicate that the atmospheric haze on Triton significantly differs from the atmospheric haze of Pluto. This may be due to Triton's lower atmosphere being significantly colder than Pluto's atmosphere by 20–40K, alongside differences in methane abundance in the upper atmospheres of each.

== Seasons ==
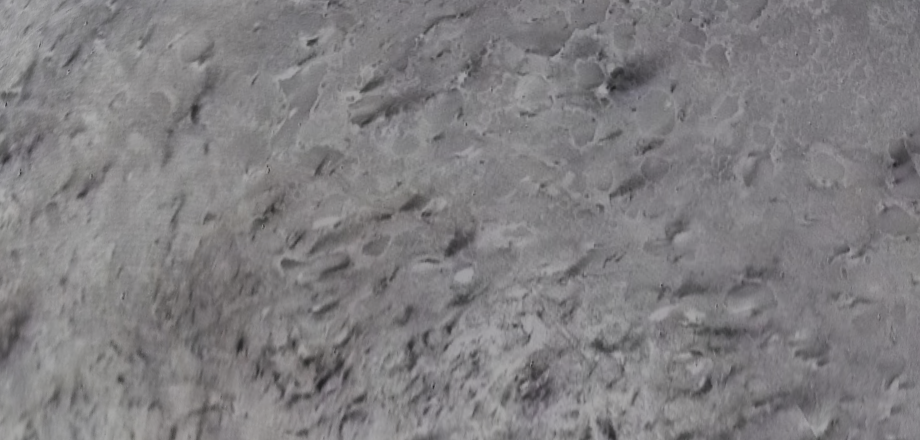
Dark plume fans on Triton's southern ice cap, possibly from seasonally-driven geysers powered by prolonged heating from the southern summer Sun

Triton's seasons are very long, owing to Neptune's orbital period of 164.8 years. Neptune's orbit is also nearly circular, with a low eccentricity of 0.0097; as such, each season on Triton lasts roughly 40 years, and Triton's seasonal variations are almost entirely governed by the tilt of its rotational axis relative to the Sun. (Note: Assuming that every season is equal in length, the season length is given by dividing the orbital period of Neptune by four.) Triton is tidally locked, with one hemisphere facing Neptune at all times; Triton's rotational period is 5 days and 21 hours and it has nearly zero axial tilt with respect to its orbital plane around Neptune. However, Triton's orbit is retrograde and significantly inclined with respect to Neptune's equator, at roughly 23°, and Neptune itself has an axial tilt of roughly 28°. Triton's orbit also experiences rapid precession, with a nodal precession period of 637 ± 40 years. The combination of these factors results in complex seasonal cycles which vary significantly between each Neptune year, with its summer solstice subsolar latitude varying between 5° latitude to 50° latitude over a 140–180 year period.

Similar to the seasons of Pluto (and, to a lesser extent, the seasons of Mars), Triton's seasons strongly affect its volatile cycles and nitrogen ice caps. Triton's volatile cycles are largely controlled by the sublimation and deposition of nitrogen and other volatile compounds. Freshly deposited nitrogen is expected to be bright as observed in Triton's southern polar cap and the bright, blue equatorial surface frost observed by Voyager 2. However, despite large regions of Triton being comparatively darker, ground-based spectral observations indicate that Triton's surface is mostly covered in a layer of transparent or translucent nitrogen ice; furthermore, modelling fails to replicate the observed distribution of bright and dark surfaces. It has been suggested that small, freshly deposited grains of nitrogen ice eventually metamorphize into a clear, transparent layer within a Triton season. Conversely, freshly deposited nitrogen ice may be translucent, before later shattering as seasonal swings in temperature induce repeated phase changes between solid nitrogen's α- and β-phases, brightening older ice.

At the time of Voyager 2's arrival, Triton was experiencing an unusually intense southern hemisphere summer. Triton's southern polar cap extended nearly or entirely up to the equator, covering large swathes of Triton's southern lower latitudes. To extend so far indicates that Triton's southern polar cap likely maintains a large, permanent sheet of nitrogen ice (as opposed to seasonally transient polar caps). Triton's northern polar cap was not observed directly, but it is presumed to exist, albeit at a significantly smaller extent than Triton's southern cap. Modelling of Triton's seasonal cycles support the existence of a permanent northern polar cap with a thickness of at least several hundred meters, and that Triton's southern polar cap is likely to be over a kilometer thick at its maximum.

The extreme southern hemisphere summer which coincided with the Voyager 2 flyby may have contributed to the significant increase in surface temperature and atmospheric surface pressure observed from 1989 to 1997; this increase in atmospheric surface pressure continued until at least 2007, before returning to Voyager 2 levels by 2017. Climate models predicted a steady decrease in atmospheric pressure through 2005–2060 as sublimated nitrogen from the southern polar cap migrates to and deposits in the expanding northern polar cap, so the causes of the rapid fluctuations in pressure remain unclear.

== See also ==
- Climate of Pluto
- Climate of Mars
