= Atmospheric science =

Study of the Earth's atmosphere

Atmospheric science is the study of the Earth's atmosphere and its various inner-working physical processes. Meteorology includes atmospheric chemistry and atmospheric physics with a major focus on weather forecasting. Climatology is the study of atmospheric conditions over timescales longer than those of weather, focusing on average climate conditions and their variability over time. Aeronomy is the study of the upper layers of the atmosphere, where dissociation and ionization are important. Atmospheric science has been extended to the field of planetary science and the study of the atmospheres of the planets and natural satellites of the Solar System.

Experimental instruments used in atmospheric science include satellites, rocketsondes, radiosondes, weather balloons, radars, and lasers.

The term aerology (from Greek ἀήρ, aēr, "air"; and -λογία, -logia) is sometimes used as an alternative term for the study of Earth's atmosphere; in other definitions, aerology is restricted to the free atmosphere, the region above the planetary boundary layer.

Early pioneers in the field include Léon Teisserenc de Bort and Richard Assmann.

== Atmospheric chemistry ==
Atmospheric chemistry is a branch of atmospheric science in which the chemistry of the Earth's atmosphere and that of other planets is studied. It is a multidisciplinary field of research and draws on environmental chemistry, physics, meteorology, computer modeling, oceanography, geology and volcanology and other disciplines. Research is increasingly connected with other areas of study such as climatology.

The composition and chemistry of the atmosphere is of importance for several reasons, but primarily because of the interactions between the atmosphere and living organisms. The composition of the Earth's atmosphere has been changed by human activity and some of these changes are harmful to human health, crops and ecosystems. Examples of problems which have been addressed by atmospheric chemistry include acid rain, photochemical smog and global warming. Atmospheric chemistry seeks to understand the causes of these problems, and by obtaining a theoretical understanding of them, allow possible solutions to be tested and the effects of changes in government policy evaluated.

Atmospheric chemistry plays a major role in understanding the concentration of gases in our atmosphere that contribute to climate change. More specifically, when combined with atmospheric physics and biogeochemistry, it is useful in terms of studying the influence of greenhouse gases like CO_{2}, N_{2}O, and CH_{4}, on Earth's radiative balance. According to UNEP, CO_{2} emissions increased to a new record of 57.1 GtCO_{2}e, up 1.3% from the previous year. Previous GHG emissions growth from 2010-2019 averaged only +0.8% yearly, illustrating the dramatic increase in global emissions. The Global Nitrous Oxide Budget cited that atmospheric N_{2}O has increased by roughly 25% between 1750 and 2022, having the fasted annual growth rate in 2020 and 2021. Atmospheric chemistry is critical in understanding what contributes to our changing climate. The warming of our climate is caused when CO_{2} emissions, constrained by biogeochemistry, are above a 0% increase. In order to stop temperatures from rising, there must be no CO_{2} emissions. By understanding the chemical composition and emission rates in our atmosphere alongside economic factors, researchers are able to trace back emissions back to their sources. About 26% of the 2023 GtCO_{2}e was used for power, 15% for transportation, 11% in industry, 11% in agriculture, etc. In order to successfully reverse the human-driven damage contributing to global climate change, cuts of nearly 42% are needed by 2030 and are to be implementing using government intervention. This is one example of how atmospheric chemistry goes hand-in-hand with social and political policy, biogeochemistry, and economic factors.

== Atmospheric dynamics ==
Composition diagram showing the evolution/cycles of various elements in Earth's atmosphere

Atmospheric dynamics is the study of motion systems of meteorological importance, integrating observations at multiple locations and times and theories. Common topics studied include diverse phenomena such as thunderstorms, tornadoes, gravity waves, tropical cyclones, extratropical cyclones, jet streams, and global-scale circulations. The goal of dynamical studies is to explain the observed circulations on the basis of fundamental principles from physics. The objectives of such studies incorporate improving weather forecasting, developing methods for predicting seasonal and interannual climate fluctuations, and understanding the implications of human-induced perturbations (e.g., increased carbon dioxide concentrations or depletion of the ozone layer) on the global climate.

== Atmospheric physics ==
Atmospheric physics is the application of physics to the study of the atmosphere. Atmospheric physicists attempt to model Earth's atmosphere and the atmospheres of the other planets using fluid flow equations, chemical models, radiation balancing, and energy transfer processes in the atmosphere and underlying oceans and land. In order to model weather systems, atmospheric physicists employ elements of scattering theory, wave propagation models, cloud physics, statistical mechanics and spatial statistics, each of which incorporate high levels of mathematics and physics. Atmospheric physics has close links to meteorology and climatology and also covers the design and construction of instruments for studying the atmosphere and the interpretation of the data they provide, including remote sensing instruments.

In the United Kingdom, atmospheric studies are underpinned by the Meteorological Office. Divisions of the U.S. National Oceanic and Atmospheric Administration (NOAA) oversee research projects and weather modeling involving atmospheric physics. The U.S. National Astronomy and Ionosphere Center also carries out studies of the high atmosphere.

The Earth's magnetic field and the solar wind interact with the atmosphere, creating the ionosphere, Van Allen radiation belts, telluric currents, and radiant energy.

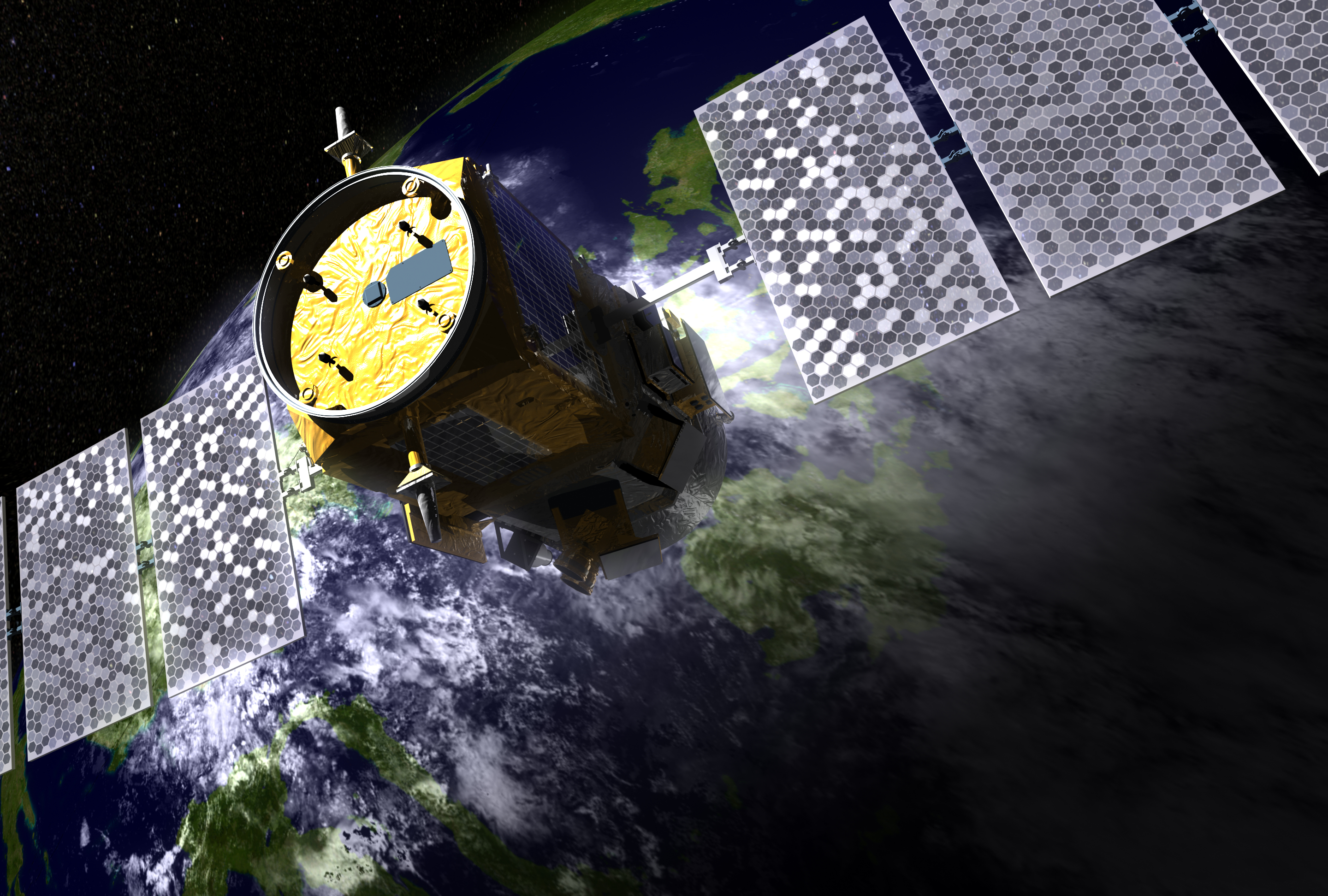
An artists conception of the CALIPSO

Recent studies in atmospheric physics often rely on satellite-based observation. One example includes CALIPSO, or the Cloud-Aerosol Lidar and Infrared Pathfinder Satellite Observation. The CALIPSO mission, engineered by NASA and the Centre National d'Etudes Spatiales/CNES, studies how clouds and airborne particles play a role in regulating the weather, climate, and quality of Earth's atmosphere. According to NASA, this mission uses methods like retrieval algorithm development, climatology development, spectroscopy, weather and climate model evaluation, and cloudy radiative transfer models in addition to atmospheric physics concepts to understand the physics involved in Earth atmospheric regulation.

== Climatology ==
Climatology is a science that derives knowledge and practices from the more specialized disciplines of meteorology, oceanography, geology, biology, and astronomy to study climate. In contrast to meteorology, which studies short-term weather systems lasting up to a few weeks, climatology studies the frequency and trends of those systems. It studies the periodicity of weather events over timescales ranging from years to millennia, as well as changes in long-term average weather patterns. Climatologists, those who practice climatology, study both the nature of climates – local, regional or global – and the natural or human-induced factors that cause climate variability and current ongoing global warming. Additionally, the occurrence of past climates on Earth, such as those arising from glacial periods and interglacials, can be used to predict future changes in climate.

Oftentimes, climatology is studied in conjunction with another specialized discipline. One recent scientific study that utilizes topics in climatology, oceanology, and even economics is entitled "Concerns about El Nino-Southern Oscillation and the Atlantic Meridional Overturning Circulation with an Increasingly Warm Ocean." Scientists under New Insights in Climate Science found that Earth is at risk of El Nino events of greater extremes and overall climate instability given new information regarding the El Nino Southern Oscillation (ENSO) and the Atlantic Meridional Overturning Circulation (AMOC). ENSO describes a recurring climate pattern in which the temperature of waters in the central and eastern tropical Pacific Ocean changes periodically. AMOC is best described by NOAA as "a system of ocean currents that circulates water within the Atlantic Ocean, bringing warm water north and cold water south". This research has revealed that the collapse of the AMOC appears to be occurring sooner than when earlier models had predicted. It also expands on the fact that our economic and social systems are more vulnerable to El Nino impacts than previously thought. The study of climatology is vital in understanding current climate risks. Research is necessary to mitigate and monitor the efforts put forth towards are ever-evolving climate. Strengthening our knowledge within the realm of climatology allows us to better prepare for the impacts of extreme El Nino events, such as amplified droughts, floods, and heat extremes.

Phenomena of climatological interest include the atmospheric boundary layer, circulation patterns, heat transfer (radiative, convective and latent), interactions between the atmosphere, the oceans and land surface (particularly vegetation, land use and topography), as well as the chemical and physical composition of the atmosphere. Related disciplines include astrophysics, atmospheric physics, chemistry, ecology, physical geography, geology, geophysics, glaciology, hydrology, oceanography, and volcanology.

== Aeronomy ==
Aeronomy is the scientific study of the upper atmosphere of the Earth — the atmospheric layers above the stratopause — and corresponding regions of the atmospheres of other planets, where the entire atmosphere may correspond to the Earth's upper atmosphere or a portion of it. A branch of both atmospheric chemistry and atmospheric physics, aeronomy contrasts with meteorology, which focuses on the layers of the atmosphere below the stratopause. In atmospheric regions studied by aeronomers, chemical dissociation and ionization are important phenomena.

== Atmospheres on other celestial bodies ==
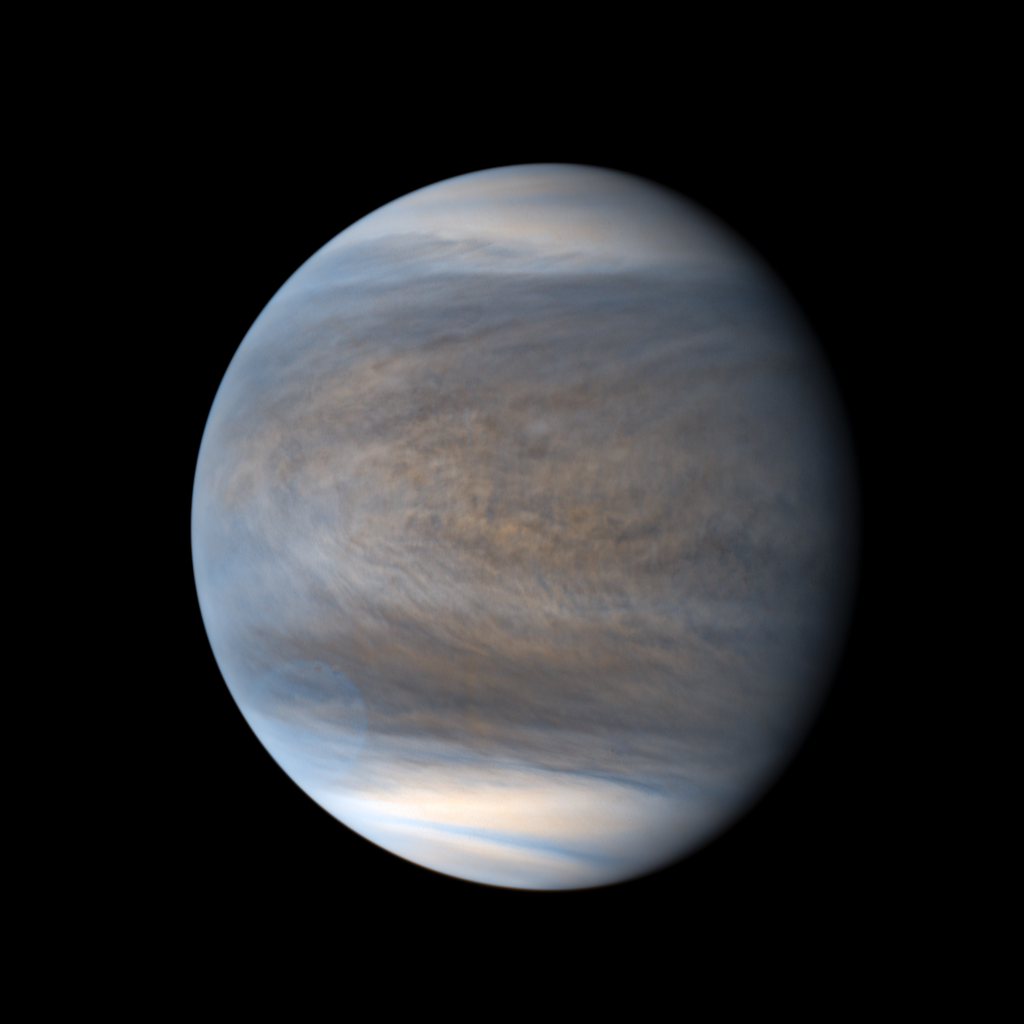
False-color image of the atmosphere of Venus in ultraviolet light, taken by the Akatsuki orbiter in October 2021

All of the Solar System's planets have atmospheres. This is because their gravity is strong enough to keep gaseous particles close to the surface. Larger gas giants are massive enough to keep large amounts of the light gases hydrogen and helium close by, while the smaller planets lose these gases into space. The composition of the Earth's atmosphere is different from the other planets because the various life processes that have transpired on the planet have introduced free molecular oxygen. Much of Mercury's atmosphere has been blasted away by the solar wind. The only moon that has retained a dense atmosphere is Titan. There is a thin atmosphere on Triton, and a trace of an atmosphere on the Moon.

Planetary atmospheres are affected by the varying degrees of energy received from either the Sun or their interiors, leading to the formation of dynamic weather systems such as hurricanes (on Earth), planet-wide dust storms (on Mars), an Earth-sized anticyclone on Jupiter (called the Great Red Spot), and holes in the atmosphere (on Neptune). At least one extrasolar planet, HD 189733 b, has been claimed to possess such a weather system, similar to the Great Red Spot but twice as large.

Hot Jupiters have been shown to be losing their atmospheres into space due to stellar radiation, much like the tails of comets. These planets may have vast differences in temperature between their day and night sides which produce supersonic winds, although the day and night sides of HD 189733b appear to have very similar temperatures, indicating that planet's atmosphere effectively redistributes the star's energy around the planet.

== See also ==
- Air pollution
