= HR 4796 =

Binary star system in the constellation Centaurus

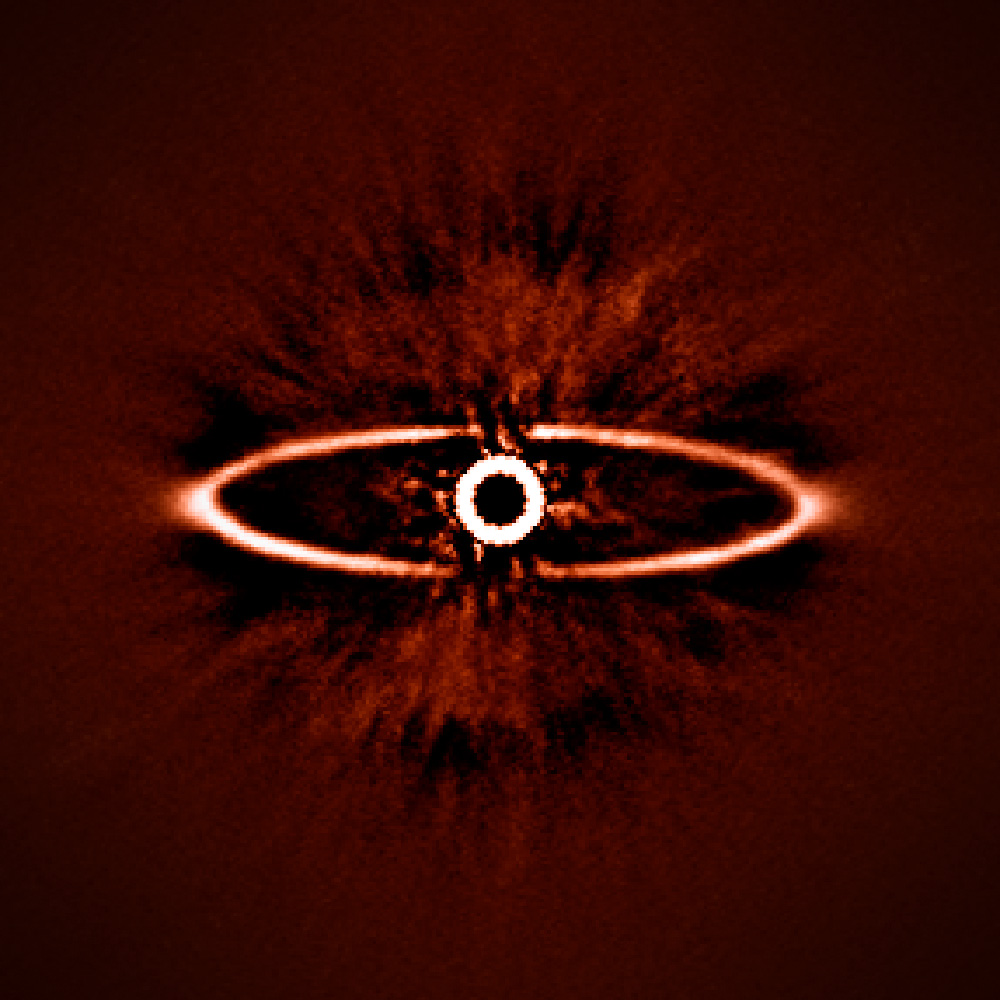
- A dust ring encircles HR 4796's primary star

Observation data Epoch J2000.0 Equinox ICRS
- Constellation: Centaurus
- A
- Right ascension: 12^{h} 36^{m} 01.0318^{s}
- Declination: −39° 52′ 10.223″
- Apparent magnitude (V): 5.77
- B
- Right ascension: 12^{h} 36^{m} 00.5491^{s}
- Declination: −39° 52′ 15.694″
- Apparent magnitude (V): 13.30

Characteristics

A
- Evolutionary stage: main sequence
- Spectral type: A0 V
- B−V color index: +0.01

B
- Evolutionary stage: pre-main-sequence
- Spectral type: M2.5 V

Astrometry

A
Radial velocity (R_{v})	+10.95±0.59 km/s
Proper motion (μ)	RA: −55.653 mas/yr Dec.: −23.880 mas/yr
Parallax (π)	14.1300±0.0471 mas
Distance	230.8 ± 0.8 ly (70.8 ± 0.2 pc)
Absolute magnitude (M_{V})	+1.46

B
Radial velocity (R_{v})	+6.27±6.72 km/s
Proper motion (μ)	RA: −59.064 mas/yr Dec.: −30.026 mas/yr
Parallax (π)	14.1490±0.0220 mas
Distance	230.5 ± 0.4 ly (70.7 ± 0.1 pc)
Absolute magnitude (M_{V})	+8.99

Details

Component A
Mass	2.18±0.10 M_{☉}
Radius	1.68 R_{☉}
Luminosity	23 L_{☉}
Surface gravity (log g)	4.43 cgs
Temperature	9,378 K
Metallicity [Fe/H]	–0.03 dex
Rotational velocity (v sin i)	152 km/s
Age	8±2 Myr

Component B
Mass	0.3 M_{☉}
Radius	0.89 R_{☉}
Luminosity	0.130 L_{☉}
Surface gravity (log g)	4.26 cgs
Temperature	3,664 K
Rotational velocity (v sin i)	12.1 km/s
Age	8±2 Myr

Other designations
- CD−39°7717, CPD−39°5622, GC 17164, HD 109573, HIP 61498, HR 4796, SAO 203621, CCDM J12360-3952, 2MASS J12360103-3952102

Database references
SIMBAD	data

HR 4796 is a binary star system in the southern constellation of Centaurus. Parallax measurements put it at a distance of 235 light-years (72 parsecs) from the Earth. The two components of this system have an angular separation of 7.7 arcseconds, which, at their estimated distance, is equivalent to a projected separation of about 560 Astronomical Units (AU), or 560 times the separation of the Earth from the Sun. The star and its ring resemble an eye, and it is sometimes known by the nickname "Sauron's Eye".

== Components ==
This is a young system with an estimated age of about 8 million years. The primary member A has a stellar classification of A0 V, while its smaller companion B is a red dwarf with a classification of M2.5 V. The luminosity class of 'V' indicates that both stars belong to the main sequence and are generating energy through the thermonuclear fusion of hydrogen at their cores. The primary is emitting this energy from its outer envelope at an effective temperature of about 9,378 K, which gives it the white hue characteristic of A-type stars. It has a radius about 168% of the radius of the Sun and 218% of the Sun's mass. The abundance of elements other than hydrogen or helium, what astronomers term the star's metallicity, is similar to the proportion in the Sun.

The secondary has only 30% of a solar mass and is still contracting towards the main sequence. It is still around the size of the Sun, although much less luminous because of its low temperature. Its brightness varies in an irregular manner and it is considered to be a T Tauri star. An X-ray flare has also been observed.

== Debris disk ==
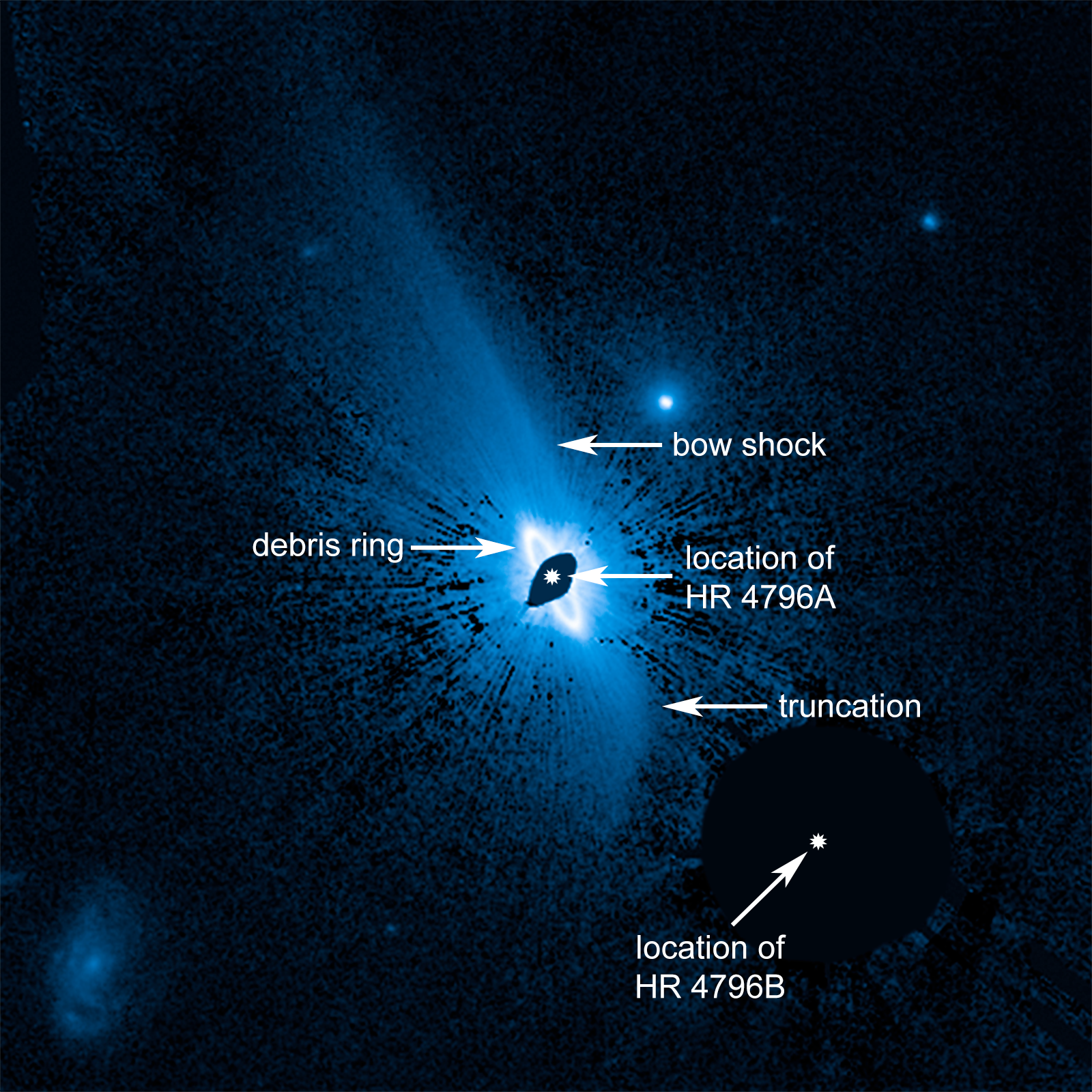
Hubble image of dust structure surrounding HR 4796A

In 1991, the primary was found to have an excess of infrared emission, implying that it has a circumstellar debris disk. Observations using the Near-Infrared Multi-Object Spectrometer aboard the Hubble Space Telescope in 2007 indicated that the dust had a reddish spectrum similar to that of tholins. The disk was resolved with the Hubble Space Telescope in 2009, confirming that it exists. Based on these images, the disk has a radius of 75 AU and a width of less than 18.5 AU. It may have some asymmetries and the center appears to be slightly offset from the star. The dust in the disk is likely the result of collisions between larger particles. In 2011, observations of the ring offset by the Subaru Telescope implies that one or more planets would likely exist within gaps tugging at its dust grains. With a new image in 2014, the configuration and alignment of the dust ring and HR4796A has been nicknamed "Eye of Sauron".

In 2017 a group using NASA/IRTF and Spitzer infrared spectroscopy of the infrared excess determined that the bright narrow ring is made up of very red devolatilzed cometary material, and that a second faint, hot diffuse dust component likely due to inspiralling material escaping from the ring was present close to the star and evaporating. The discovery of a complex dust structure about 1,600 AU across, enveloping HR 4796A, was announced in March 2018. The structure is believed to have been formed by the pressure of starlight from HR 4796A expelling dust from the debris disk far into space. The structure is much more extended in one direction than the other, possibly due to either the motion of HR 4796A through the interstellar medium, or the gravitational influence of HR 4796B.

== Kinematics ==
The space velocity of HR 4796 in the Galactic coordinate system is [U, V, W] = [−8.5, −18.3, −3.6] km s^{−1}. This trajectory and the location of the system suggests that it may be a member of the TW Hydrae association of stars that share a common origin. A low-mass member of this association, identified as 2MASS J12354893−3950245, may be a tertiary component of the HR 4796 system. It has a proper motion matching HR 4796, suggesting it is gravitationally bound to the other two stars, and is separated from the pair by a distance of about 13,500 AU.
