= Bishun Khare =

Astronomer and planetary scientist (1933–2013)

- Born: Bishun Narain Khare; 27 June 1933; Varanasi, India
- Died: 20 August 2013 (aged 80)
- Occupation: Research scientist
- Known for: Tholin

Bishun Narain Khare (27 June 1933 – 20 August 2013) was a scientist who specialized in the chemistry of planetary atmospheres and of molecules relevant to biology. He published several papers on tholins, the organic molecules formed by ultraviolet radiation or cosmic rays. From 1968 to 1996, Khare worked in Carl Sagan's Laboratory for Planetary Studies at Cornell University. During this time he appeared in the Cosmos television series. From 1996 to 1998, he worked at the NASA Ames Research Center and from 1998 onward he worked at the SETI Institute.

After his death, the International Astronomical Union named a crater on Pluto after him called the Khare Crater.

== References and external links ==
- Profile on SETI
- Memorial Page on SETI
