= Tholin =

Class of molecules formed by ultraviolet irradiation of organic compounds

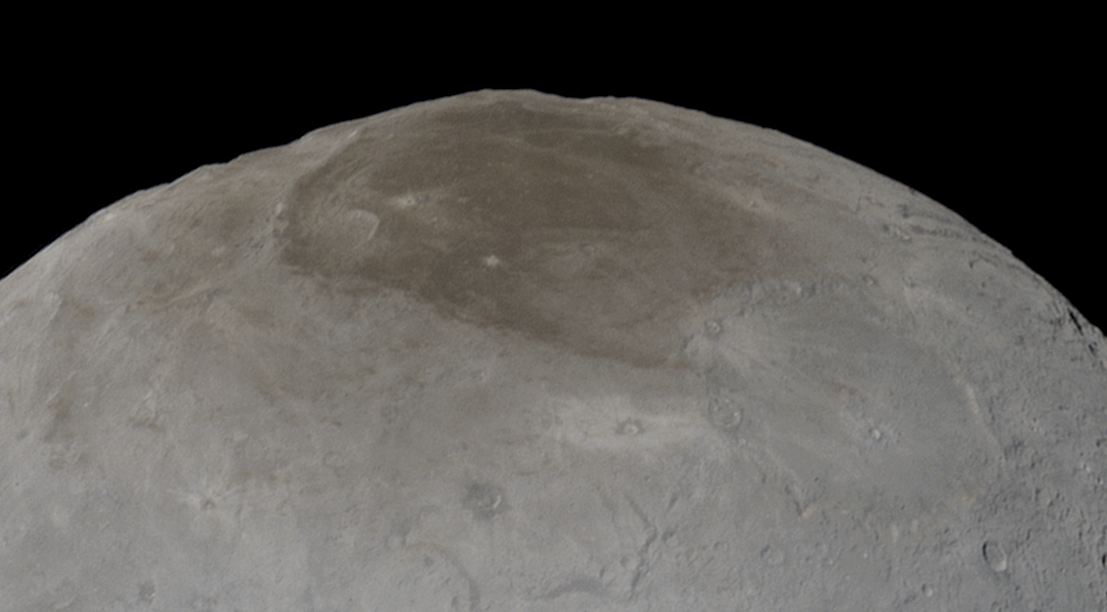
Neverland Regio, a dark region on Charon's north pole. The region is stained a dark brown by deposits of tholins

Tholins (after the Greek θολός (tholós) "hazy" or "muddy"; from the ancient Greek word meaning "sepia ink") are a wide variety of organic compounds formed by solar ultraviolet or cosmic ray irradiation of simple carbon-containing compounds such as carbon dioxide (CO_{2}), methane (CH_{4}) or ethane (C_{2}H_{6}), often in combination with nitrogen (N_{2}) or water (H_{2}O). Tholins are disordered polymer-like materials made of repeating chains of linked subunits and complex combinations of functional groups, typically nitriles and hydrocarbons, and their degraded forms such as amines and phenyls. Tholins do not form naturally on modern-day Earth, but they are found in great abundance on the surfaces of icy bodies in the outer Solar System, and as reddish aerosols in the atmospheres of outer Solar System planets and moons.

In the presence of water, tholins could be raw materials for prebiotic chemistry (i.e., the non-living chemistry that forms the basic chemicals of which life is made). Their existence has implications for the origins of life on Earth and possibly on other planets. As particles in an atmosphere, tholins scatter light, and can affect habitability.

Tholins may be produced in a laboratory, and are usually studied as a heterogeneous mixture of many chemicals with many different structures and properties. Using techniques including thermogravimetric analysis, astrochemists analyze the composition of laboratory-produced tholin mixtures and the exact character of the individual chemicals within them.

== Overview ==
Polyacrylonitrile, one hypothesized polymeric component of tholins, mostly in chemically degraded form as polymers containing nitrile and amino groups. It is used experimentally to create tholin mixtures.

The term "tholin" was coined by astronomer Carl Sagan and his colleague Bishun Khare to describe the difficult-to-characterize substances they obtained in his Miller–Urey-type experiments on the methane-containing gas mixtures such as those found in Titan's atmosphere. Their paper proposing the name "tholin" said:

For the past decade we have been producing in our laboratory a variety of complex organic solids from mixtures of the cosmically abundant gases CH_{4}, C_{2}H_{6}, NH_{3}, H_{2}O, HCHO, and H_{2}S. The product, synthesized by ultraviolet (UV) light or spark discharge, is a brown, sometimes sticky, residue, which has been called, because of its resistance to conventional analytical chemistry, "intractable polymer". [...] We propose, as a model-free descriptive term, 'tholins' (Greek Θολός, muddy; but also Θόλος, vault or dome), although we were tempted by the phrase 'star-tar'.

Tholins are not one specific compound but rather are descriptive of a spectrum of molecules, including heteropolymers, that give a reddish, organic surface covering on certain planetary surfaces. Tholins are disordered polymer-like materials made of repeating chains of linked subunits and complex combinations of functional groups. Sagan and Khare note "The properties of tholins will depend on the energy source used and the initial abundances of precursors, but a general physical and chemical similarity among the various tholins is evident."

Some researchers in the field prefer a narrowed definition of tholins, for example, S. Hörst wrote: "Personally, I try to use the word 'tholins' only when describing the laboratory-produced samples, in part because we do not really know yet how similar the material we produce in the lab is to the material found on places like Titan or Triton (or Pluto!)." French researchers also use the term tholins only when describing the laboratory-produced samples as analogues. NASA scientists also prefer the word 'tholin' for the products of laboratory simulations, and use the term 'refractory residues' for actual observations on astronomical bodies.

== Formation ==
The formation of tholins in the atmosphere of Titan

=== Artificially ===
The key elements of tholins are carbon, nitrogen, and hydrogen. Laboratory infrared spectroscopy analysis of experimentally synthesized tholins has confirmed earlier identifications of chemical groups present, including primary amines, nitriles, and alkyl portions such as CH_{2}/CH_{3} forming complex disordered macromolecular solids. Laboratory tests generated complex solids formed from exposure of N_{2}:CH_{4} gaseous mixtures to electrical discharge in cold plasma conditions, reminiscent of the famous Miller–Urey experiment conducted in 1952.

=== Naturally ===
As illustrated, tholins are thought to form in nature through a chain of chemical reactions known as pyrolysis and radiolysis. This begins with the dissociation and ionization of molecular nitrogen (N_{2}) and methane (CH_{4}) by energetic particles and solar radiation. This is followed by the formation of ethylene, ethane, acetylene, hydrogen cyanide, and other small simple molecules and small positive ions. Further reactions form benzene and other organic molecules, and their polymerization leads to the formation of an aerosol of heavier molecules, which then condense and precipitate on the planetary surface below.

Tholins formed at low pressure tend to contain nitrogen atoms in the interior of their molecules, while tholins formed at high pressure are more likely to have nitrogen atoms located in terminal positions.

Tholins may be a major constituent of the interstellar medium. On Titan, their chemistry is initiated at high altitudes and participates in the formation of solid organic particles.

These atmospherically derived substances are distinct from ice tholin II, which are formed instead by irradiation (radiolysis) of clathrates of water and organic compounds such as methane (CH_{4}) or ethane (C_{2}H_{6}). The radiation-induced synthesis on ice are independent of temperature.

Models show that, even when far from UV radiation of a star, cosmic ray doses may be fully sufficient to convert carbon-containing ice grains entirely to complex organics in less than the lifetime of the typical interstellar cloud.

== Biological significance ==
Some researchers have speculated that Earth may have been seeded by organic compounds early in its development by tholin-rich comets, providing the raw material necessary for life to develop. (See Miller–Urey experiment for discussion.) Tholins do not exist naturally on present-day Earth due to the oxidizing properties of the free oxygen component of its atmosphere ever since the Great Oxygenation Event around 2.4 billion years ago.

Laboratory experiments suggest that tholins near large pools of liquid water that might persist for thousands of years could facilitate prebiotic chemistry, and have implications for the origins of life on Earth and possibly other planets. Also, as particles in the atmosphere of an exoplanet, tholins affect the light scatter and act as a screen for protecting planetary surfaces from ultraviolet radiation, affecting habitability. Laboratory simulations found derived residues related to amino acids as well as urea, with important astrobiological implications.

On Earth, a wide variety of soil bacteria are able to use laboratory-produced tholins as their sole source of carbon. Tholins could have been the first microbial food for heterotrophic microorganisms before autotrophy evolved.

== Occurrence ==
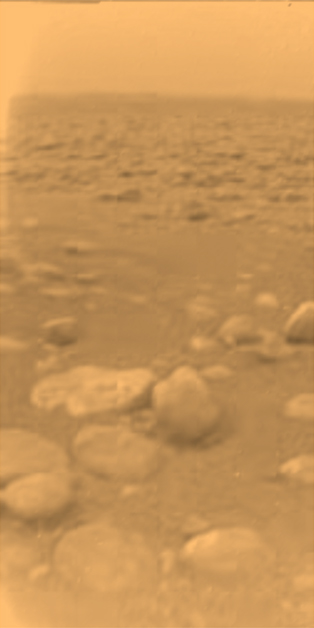
The surface of Titan as viewed from the Huygens lander. Tholins are suspected to be the source of the reddish color of both the surface and the atmospheric haze.

Sagan and Khare note the presence of tholins through multiple locations: "as a constituent of the Earth's primitive oceans and therefore relevant to the origin of life; as a component of red aerosols in the atmospheres of the outer planets and Titan; present in comets, carbonaceous chondrites asteroids, and pre-planetary solar nebulae; and as a major constituent of the interstellar medium." The surfaces of comets, centaurs, and many icy moons and Kuiper-belt objects in the outer Solar System are rich in deposits of tholins.

=== Moons ===
==== Titan ====
Titan tholins are nitrogen-rich organic substances produced by the irradiation of the gaseous mixtures of nitrogen and methane found in the atmosphere and surface of Titan. Titan's atmosphere is about 97% nitrogen, 2.7±0.1% methane and the remaining trace amounts of other gases. In the case of Titan, the haze and orange-red color of its atmosphere are both thought to be caused by the presence of tholins.

==== Europa ====
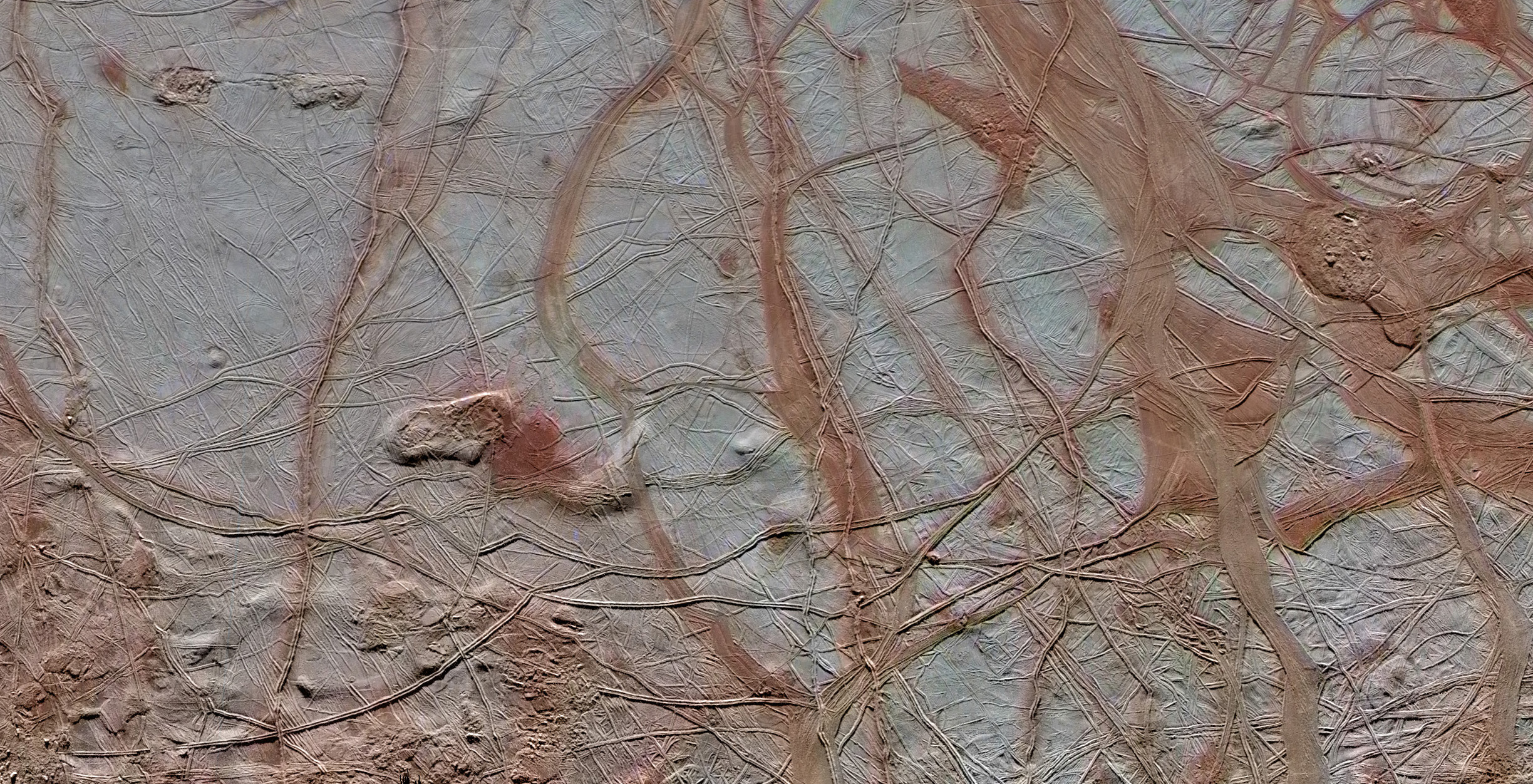
Linear fractures on Europa's surface, likely colored by tholins.

Colored regions on Jupiter's satellite Europa are thought to be tholins. The morphology of Europa's impact craters and ridges is suggestive of fluidized material welling up from the fractures where pyrolysis and radiolysis take place. In order to generate colored tholins on Europa there must be a source of materials (carbon, nitrogen, and water), and a source of energy to drive the reactions. Impurities in the water ice crust of Europa are presumed both to emerge from the interior as cryovolcanic events that resurface the body, and to accumulate from space as interplanetary dust.

==== Rhea ====
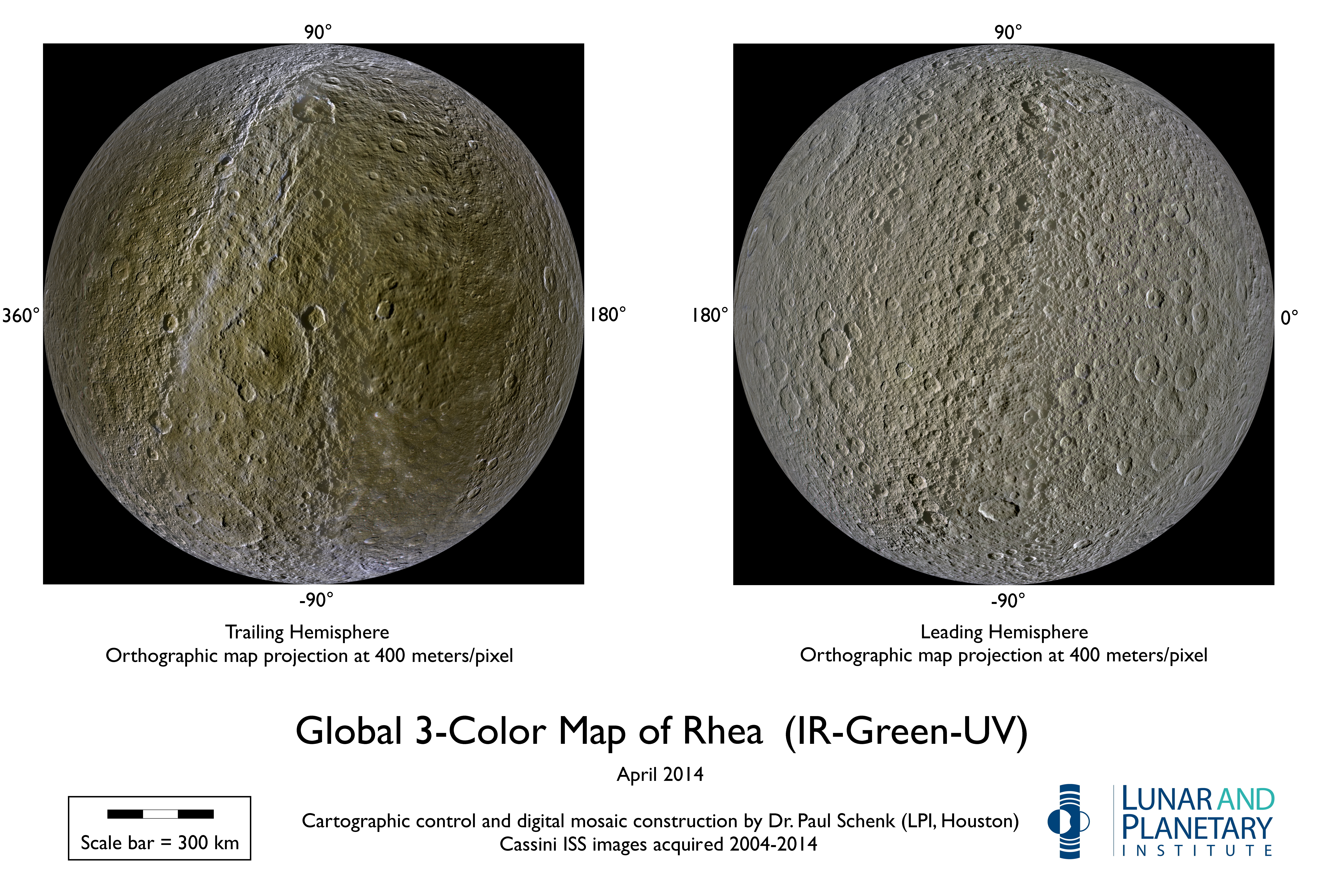
The trailing hemisphere of Saturn's moon Rhea is covered with tholins.

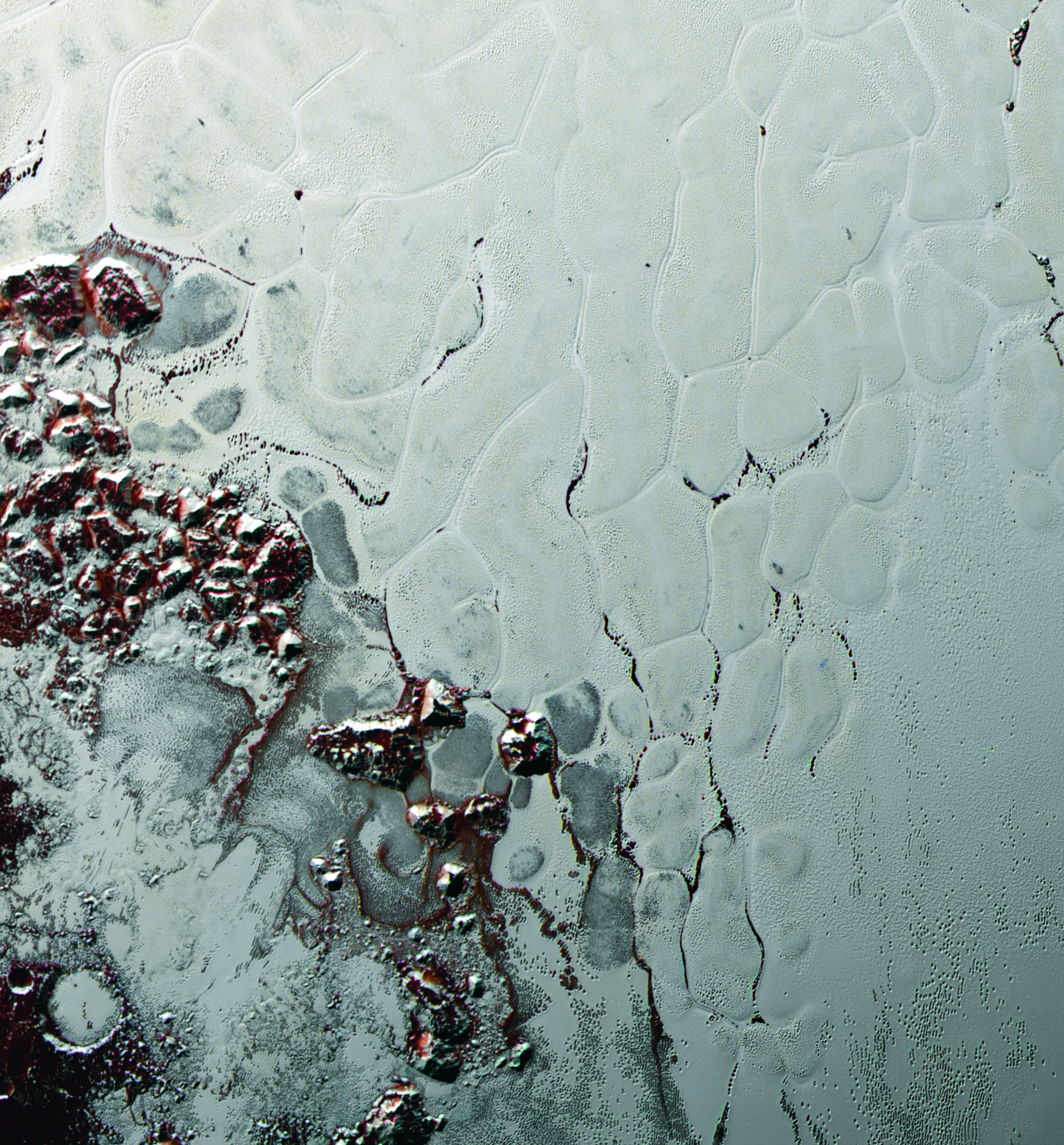
Close-up view of Sputnik Planitia on Pluto as viewed by the New Horizons spacecraft, showing nitrogen ice glaciers and reddish-colored tholins.

The extensive dark areas on the trailing hemisphere of Saturn's moon Rhea are thought to be deposited tholins.

==== Triton ====
Neptune's moon Triton is observed to have the reddish color characteristic of tholins. Triton's atmosphere is mostly nitrogen, with trace amounts of methane and carbon monoxide.

=== Dwarf planets ===
==== Pluto ====
Tholins occur on the dwarf planet Pluto and are responsible for red colors as well as the blue tint of the atmosphere of Pluto. The reddish-brown cap of the north pole of Charon, the largest of five moons of Pluto, is thought to be composed of tholins, produced from methane, nitrogen and related gases released from the atmosphere of Pluto and transferred over about 19,000 km (12,000 mi) distance to the orbiting moon.

==== Ceres ====
Tholins were detected on the dwarf planet Ceres by the Dawn mission. Most of the planet's surface is extremely rich in carbon, with approximately 20% carbon by mass in its near surface. The carbon content is more than five times higher than in carbonaceous chondrite meteorites analyzed on Earth.

==== Makemake ====
Makemake exhibits methane, large amounts of ethane and tholins, as well as smaller amounts of ethylene, acetylene and high-mass alkanes may be present, most likely created by photolysis of methane by solar radiation.

=== Kuiper belt objects and Centaurs ===
The reddish color typical of tholins is characteristic of many trans-Neptunian objects, including plutinos in the outer Solar System such as 28978 Ixion. Spectral reflectances of centaurs also suggest the presence of tholins on their surfaces. The New Horizons exploration of the classical Kuiper belt object 486958 Arrokoth revealed reddish color at its surface, suggestive of tholins.

=== Comets and asteroids ===
Tholins were detected in situ by the Rosetta mission to comet 67P/Churyumov–Gerasimenko. Tholins are not typically characteristic of main-belt asteroids, but have been detected on the asteroid 24 Themis.

=== Tholins beyond the Solar System ===
Tholins may have also been detected in the stellar system of the young star HR 4796A using the Near-Infrared Camera and Multi-Object Spectrometer (NICMOS) aboard the Hubble Space Telescope. The HR 4796 system is approximately 220 light years from Earth.

== See also ==
- Abiogenesis – Life arising from non-living matter
- Asphaltene – Heavy organic molecular substances that are found in crude oil
- Hemolithin – Protein claimed to be of extraterrestrial origin
- Kerogen – Solid organic matter in sedimentary rocks
- PAH world hypothesis – Hypothesis about the origin of life
- Pseudo-panspermia – Supported hypothesis for the origin of life
