= Climate of Pluto =

The climate of Pluto concerns the atmospheric dynamics, weather, and long-term trends on the dwarf planet Pluto. Five climate zones are assigned on the dwarf planet: tropics, arctic, tropical arctic, diurnal, and polar. These climate zones are delineated based on astronomically defined boundaries or sub-solar latitudes, which are not associated with the atmospheric circulations on the dwarf planet. Charon, the largest moon of Pluto, is tidally locked with it, and thus has the same climate zone structure as Pluto itself.

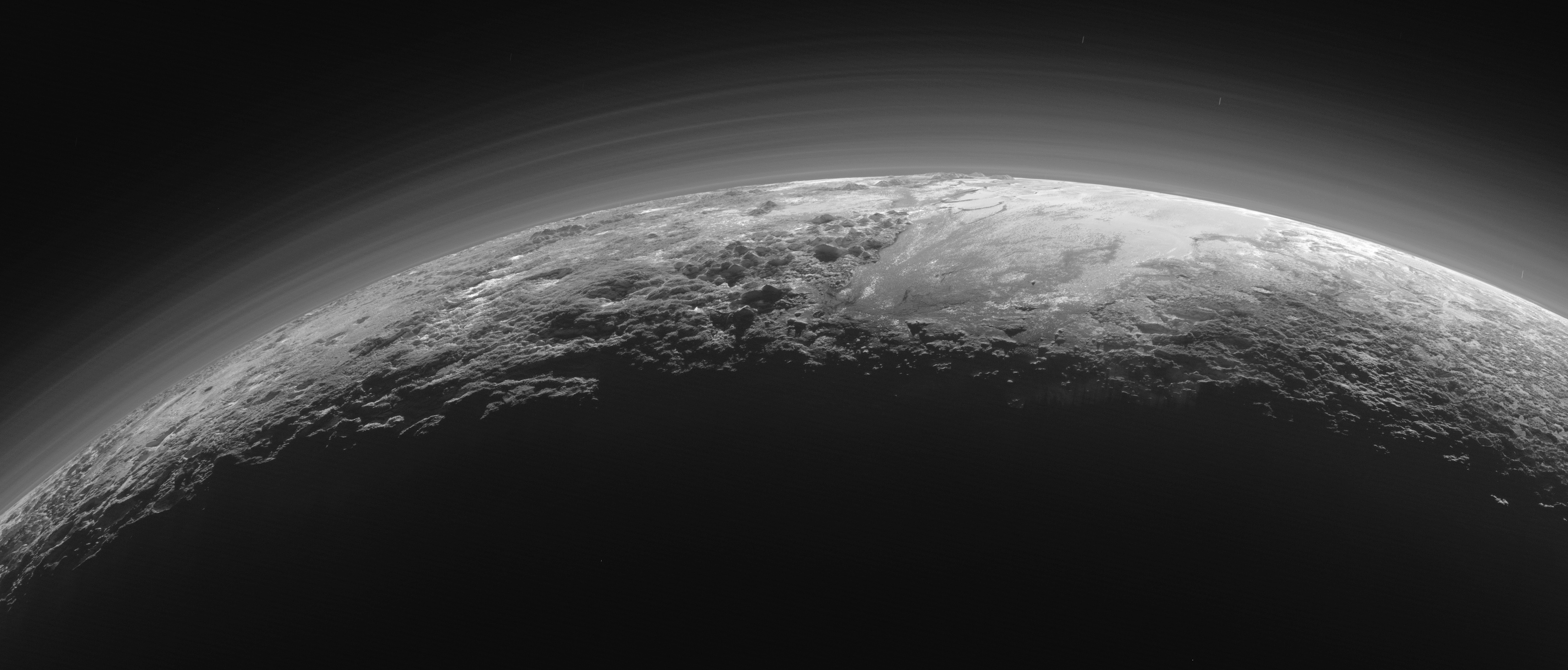
Haze with multiple layers in the atmosphere of Pluto. Part of the plain Sputnik Planitia with nearby mountains is seen below. Photo by New Horizons, taken 15 min after the closest approach to Pluto.

Pluto is an icy body, the most prominent object in the solar system's Kuiper belt. Its surface is primarily composed of methane (CH_{4}), nitrogen (N_{2}), and carbon monoxide (CO) volatile ices in various spatial abundances and distribution. Though Pluto is small compared to typical planets, it has an atmosphere, though much thinner than Earth's. Containing multiple layers of haze, its atmosphere is composed mainly of nitrogen (N_{2}) with trace amount of methane (CH_{4}) and carbon monoxide (CO). Long-term climate cycles of planetary bodies (e.g., Earth) are associated with axial precession and variations in the obliquity and orbital eccentricity. However, in the case of Pluto, the orbital eccentricity and axial precession cycles have less influence on the climate cycles of the dwarf planet than the obliquity variation. Consequently, the climate zones of Pluto were determined based on the obliquity variation only.

== Characteristics and climate zones ==
There are five climate zones on Pluto which are defined by the sub-solar latitude, each with specific boundaries. However, the latitude ranges of the climate zones expand and shrink in response to the obliquity range of Pluto from a minimum of 103° to a maximum of 127° over the 2.8 million year oscillation period. That means some of the zones have permanent latitude ranges, whereas other zones change their boundaries based on the variation of the axial tilt on a multi-million-year time scale. Permanent boundaries refer to the latitude zones that experience certain characteristics at all times, regardless of the obliquity variation of the dwarf planet over the obliquity oscillation period. Because Charon is tidally-locked with Pluto, it has the same structure of climate zones.

=== Tropics ===
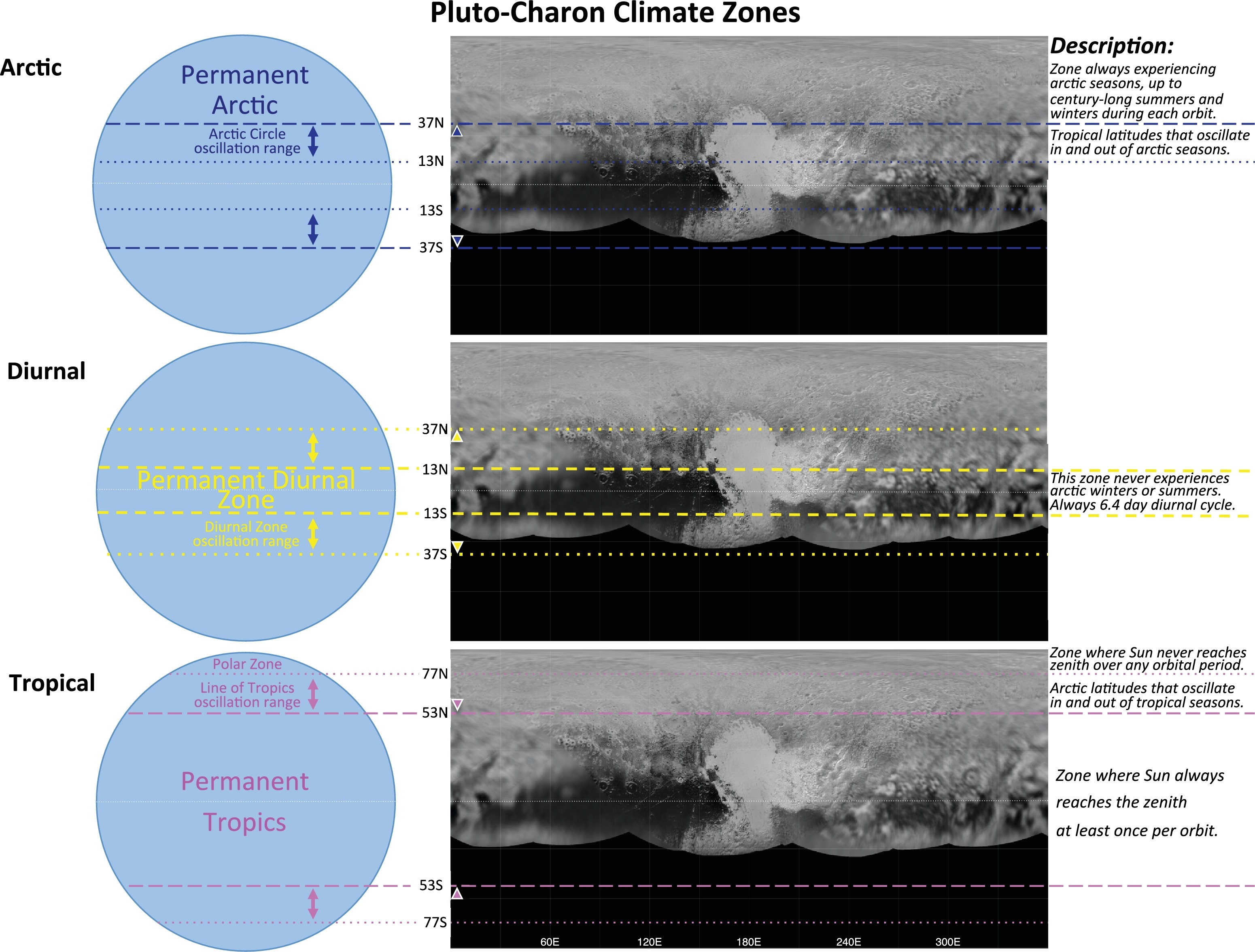
Arctic, diurnal, and tropical zones of Pluto; oscillation of the zones in response to the obliquity cycle is displayed by dashed lines

The tropics of Pluto are defined as the latitude ranges in which the Sun reaches its overhead point, or zenith, at least once during Pluto's orbital period around the Sun. By this definition, the tropics stretch from the latitude of 60°N to 60°S, due to the current obliquity of 120°. However, when the obliquity reaches its minimum value of 103°, the tropics expand to the maximum latitude ranges from 77°N to 77°S. At this period, the tropics cover most of the surface of the dwarf planet, encompassing around 97% of the total surface area.

In contrast, when the obliquity rises to its maximum of 127°, the tropics contract down to the minimum latitude range from 53°N to 53°S. At that time, the tropics only cover 80% of the surface area of the planet. Accordingly, the 53°N to 53°S latitude range is called the permanent tropics of Pluto. Since the permanent tropics cover at least 80% of the surface area, most of Pluto's surface always lies in the tropical region. The permanent tropics always receive direct overhead sunlight during every orbital period of Pluto, and overall, they show the greatest range of albedo variation.

=== Arctic ===
The arctic climate of Pluto is defined as the latitude ranges that, during one orbit, experience both continuous sunlight during summer season and continuous darkness during winter season. The permanent arctic zones of the dwarf planet range from 90°N to 37°N in the northern hemisphere and from 90°S to 37°S in the southern hemisphere. In total, these two arctic regions cover around 40% of the dwarf planet's surface area. The surface constitutional data of Pluto shows that the permanent arctic zones are co-located with N_{2}-rich surface. A long period of continuous winter, typically lasting more than a century, is experienced by the permanent arctic zones in every Pluto orbital period of 248 years over the 2.8 million year obliquity cycle.

Due to the variation in the axial tilting of Pluto, the arctic zones also expand and contract over the oscillation cycle. With the current obliquity of 120°, the arctic zones extend from 30°N to 90°N in the northern hemisphere, whereas it is 30°S to 90°S in the southern hemisphere. These two arctic zones together cover 50 percent of the total surface area of Pluto. The maximum latitude range of the arctic extends to near-equatorial latitudes of 13°N and 13°S when the obliquity goes down to its minimum of 103°. At that time, the arctic circles cover around 78% of the total surface area. The high obliquity induced in latitude variations in arctic zones extending down to near-equatorial regions indicates that the maximum amount of insolation is received at the poles.

=== Diurnal ===
The diurnal climate zone of Pluto is defined as the latitudinal ranges where day and night cycle occur for each rotation throughout the entire orbital year. The high mean obliquity and oscillation cycle make a narrow latitudinal band experience a diurnal circle. Pluto experiences the narrowest band of diurnal zone when the obliquity comes down to minimum of 103°, which occurred around ~0.8 million years ago. This band from 13°N to 13°S, extending equally on both sides of the equator, is called the permanent diurnal zone. The permanent diurnal zone covers 22 percent of the total areas of the dwarf planet. The region experiences a continuous sunrise and sunset for each and every Pluto rotation period of 6.4 days over a time period of 10 million years.

The present-day diurnal climate zone of Pluto spans from 30°N to 30°S, encompassing 50% of the total surface area, due to the current axial tilt of 120°. As obliquity changes to rise from this value, the diurnal zone will expand to the maximum from 37°N to 37°S (covering a total area of 60%), which will be reached in roughly 600,000 years. The morphology of this zone is characterized by a nearly uniform width of dark equatorial band and comprises a zone of mostly sharp contrasting albedo.

=== Tropical arctic ===
The tropical arctic zone covers the overlapping regions of the tropical and arctic zones. This unique climatic zone is only possible on objects that have an obliquity range between 45° and 135°. Since the obliquity of Pluto varies between a minimum of 103° and a maximum of 127°, it therefore has a tropical arctic climate zone. This high obliquity implies that most of Pluto's surface experiences both tropical and arctic climates over the 2.8 million year obliquity cycle. The tropical arctic zone includes the region that overlaps between tropical and arctic zones extending between 13°N and 77°N and 13°S to 77°S. At this latitudinal range the zones cover 75% of the total surface area. However, like the oscillation of tropical (between 53° and 77° latitude) and arctic (between 13° and 37° latitude) zones, the tropical arctic zone also expands and contrasts over the course of the obliquity cycle. Only the latitude range between 37° and 53° in each hemisphere remains stable over the period, and therefore, those bands are called the permanent tropical arctic zones on Pluto (which covers 20% of the total area).

The maximum extent of the tropical arctic zone spans between 13° and 77° latitude in both the southern and northern hemispheres (and covers about 75% of the total surface area). With the current obliquity of 120°, the present day's tropical arctic extends from 30°N to 30°S encompassing 50% of Pluto's surface area. The tropical arctic zone is the area that experiences maximum cyclical extremes and is optimum for long-term seasonal layering (e.g. al-Idrisi Montes).

=== Polar ===
Pluto's polar zone comprises those areas where the Sun never reaches the zenith at any time of the orbital period of the dwarf planet over its entire obliquity cycle. This region always experiences arctic climate, never tropical climate, and it consistently experiences the longest duration of arctic winter and summer during each and every orbital rotation of Pluto. The polar zone has a radius of 13° from each pole. The zone spans from 77°N to 90°N and from 77°S to 90°S, encompassing an area total of 3% of the dwarf planet. The regions between 77° and 90° latitudes of each hemisphere are called the permanent polar climate zones. However, the maximum extent of the polar zones can span from 53°N to 90°N and from 53°S to 90°S with an area total of 20% of the body. At present day, the polar zones extend between 60° and 90° of both the northern and southern hemispheres (covering an area of 13% of the planet). Pluto's biggest moon Charon also has a polar zone consisting of a polar cap.

== Correlation to surface morphology ==
The diurnal zone on Pluto between 13°N and 13°S never experiences any period of continuous summer or winter. The equatorial regions of Pluto predominately consist of a dark band with distinct boundaries. This equatorial dark band region coincides with the permanent diurnal climate zone on Pluto. The high-albedo terrain of the diurnal zone remains warm enough that it cannot be a cold trap for volatile. The absence of any interval of arctic winter darkness also precludes the possibilities of volatile cold trapping in the high-albedo diurnal zone. Conversely, the lower-albedo region in the diurnal zone has a higher reflectivity to solar insolation. These higher-albedo areas radiate away absorbed energy at night for every rotation of the planet and become a cold trap for volatile. The temperature cycle near the equator (in the diurnal zone) maintains sharp albedo variations between the bright and dark regions.

The correlation between the surface compositional distribution of methane (CH_{4}) and nitrogen (N_{2}) and the climate zones is somewhat speculative. CH_{4} is widely distributed outside the Tombaugh Regio and Belton Regio, possibly at latitudinal bands of the northern boundary of Cthulhu. Conversely, N_{2} is concentrated in the latitudes above 30°N coinciding with the permanent arctic climate zone which spans from 37°N latitude to the pole. Some areas on Pluto's surface experience both tropical and arctic climate since both of the climate zones oscillate in response to the obliquity cycle. A substantial area falls under tropical arctic climate state due to the oscillation of the climate pattern. The layering of the Al-Idrisi Montes at 37°N latitude is speculated to be formed due to the long-term climate cycle in this latitude. The latitude of 37°N is considered as the boundary latitude involving mixing of the tropical (overhead Sun) and arctic (constant dark winter) seasons.

== See also ==
- Geology of Pluto
- Geography of Pluto
