= Atmosphere of Triton =

Layer of gasses surrounding the moon Triton

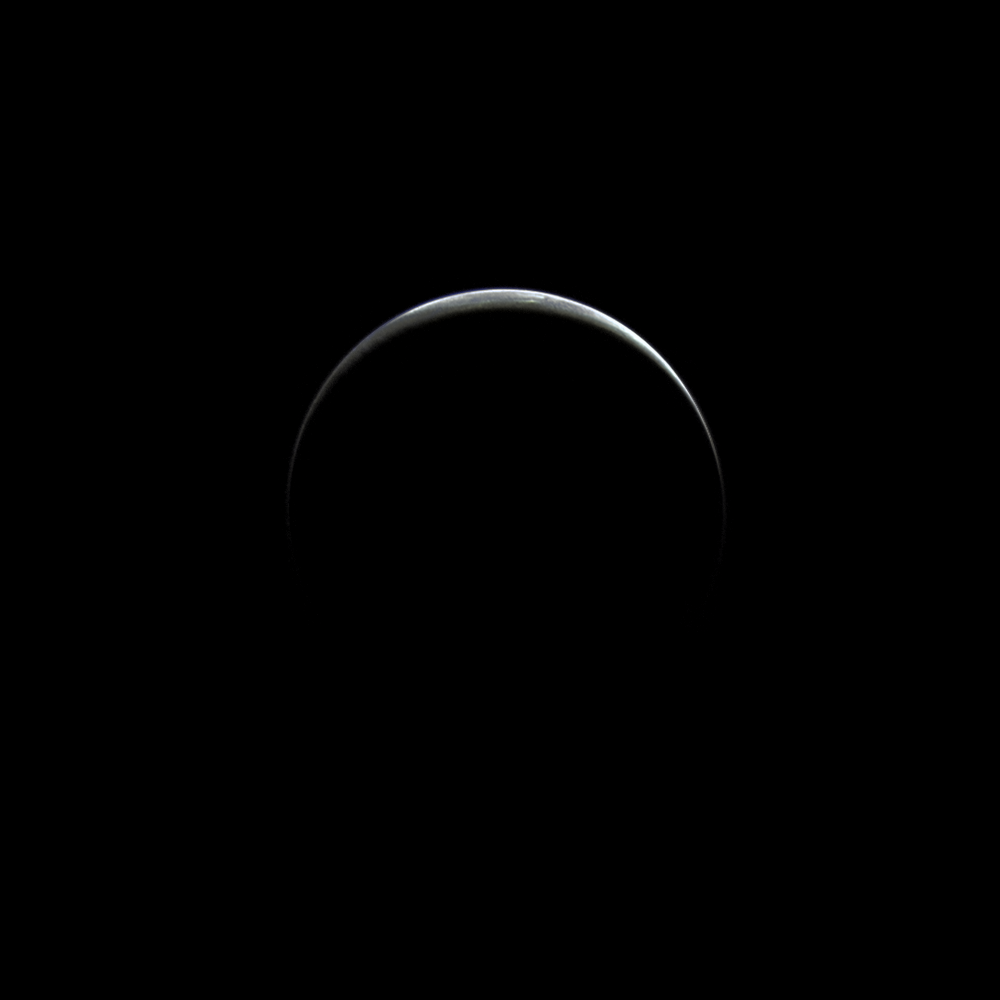
- Voyager 2 image of Triton after closest approach, showing the haze in Triton's atmosphere weakly scattering sunlight and "extending" its thin crescent

General information
- Height: ~870 km (exobase)
- Average surface pressure: ~1.4 Pa (1.38×10^{−5} atm) (1989) ~1.9 Pa (1.88×10^{−5} atm) (1997) ~1.454 Pa (1.43×10^{−5} atm) (2022)
- Scale height: 14.8 km

Composition (Note: These values were measured in 2010; as no occultation had observed Triton's atmospheric pressure between 1997 and 2017, Lellouch and collaborators tentatively favored an assumed atmospheric pressure of 40 μbar (4 Pa). Percentages were derived by dividing the given partial pressure by an assumed atmospheric pressure of 4 Pa.)
- Nitrogen (N_{2}): >99%
- Methane (CH_{4}): ~0.025%
- Carbon monoxide (CO): ~0.06%

The atmosphere of Triton is the layer of gases surrounding Triton. Like the atmospheres of Titan and Pluto, Triton's atmosphere is composed more than 95% of nitrogen, with smaller amounts of methane and carbon monoxide. It hosts a layer of organic haze extending up to 30 kilometers above its surface and a deck of thin bright clouds at about 4 kilometers in altitude. Due to Triton's low gravity, its atmosphere is loosely bound, extending over 800 kilometers from its surface.

Triton, along with Saturn's moon Titan, is one of only two moons in the Solar System known to have significant, global atmospheres. (Note: Saturn's moon Enceladus; Jupiter's moons Io, Europa, Ganymede, and Callisto; and possibly Uranus's moon Titania all have atmospheres as well, but are too thin to drive weather or climate.) The surface pressure is only 14 microbars (1.4 Pa or 0.0105mmHg), 1/70000 of the surface pressure on Earth. Similar to the atmosphere of Pluto, Triton's atmosphere is sensitive to seasonal changes; observations obtained in 1998 showed an increase in temperature, increasing the atmosphere's density.

== Composition and chemistry ==
Nitrogen is the main gas in Triton's atmosphere. The two other known components are methane and carbon monoxide, whose abundances are a few hundredths of a percent of that of the nitrogen. Carbon monoxide, which was first detected in 2010 by the ground-based observations, is slightly more abundant than methane. The abundance of methane relative to nitrogen increased by four to five times since 1986 due to the seasonal warming observed on Triton, which passed its southern-hemisphere solstice in 2001. Compositionally, Triton's atmosphere strongly resembles that of Pluto's atmosphere, being almost entirely nitrogen with minor contributions from other gasses.

Other possible components of the Triton's atmosphere include argon and neon. Because they were not detected in the ultraviolet part of the spectrum of Triton obtained by Voyager 2 in 1989, their abundances are unlikely to exceed a few percent. In addition to the gases mentioned above, the upper atmosphere contains significant amounts of both molecular and atomic hydrogen, which is produced by the photolysis of methane. This hydrogen quickly escapes into the space serving as a source of plasma in the magnetosphere of Neptune.

Chemistry in Triton's atmosphere
Molecule	Production	Loss
Hydrogen (H_{2})	Various	Escape
Hydrogen (H)	Various	Escape
Nitrogen (N_{2})	Cryovolcanism? $\ce{N + NH->N2 + H}$ $\ce{2N + N2->2N2}$	Escape $\ce{N+2 + H2->N2H+ + H}$ $\ce{NH+ + N2->N2H+ + N}$
Nitrogen (N)	$\ce{H + NH->N + H2}$	Escape $\ce{N + NH->N2 + H}$ $\ce{2N + N2->2N2}$ $\ce{N+ + H2->NH+ + H}$
Methane (CH_{4})	Cryovolcanism?	$\ce{CH4 + h\nu->CH2 + 2H}$ $\ce{CH4 + h\nu->CH2 + H2}$ $\ce{CH4 + h\nu->CH + H + H2}$
Carbon monoxide cations (CO^{+})	$\ce{N+2 + CO->CO+ + N2}$ $\ce{N+ + CO->CO+ + N}$	$\ce{CO+ + H->CO + H+}$ $\ce{CO+ + e->C + O}$ $\ce{CO+ + H2->HCO+ + H}$
Methylene (CH_{2})	$\ce{CH4 + h\nu->CH2 + 2H}$ $\ce{CH4 + h\nu->CH2 + H2}$	$\ce{CH2 + H->CH + H2}$
Ethylene (C_{2}H_{4})	$\ce{2CH4 + h\nu->C2H4 + 1.5H2 + H}$ $\ce{CH + CH4->C2H4 + H}$	

=== Interactions with Neptune ===
Triton's atmosphere interacts with Neptune through Neptune's magnetosphere, with interactions complicated by Triton's retrograde orbit and Neptune's asymmetric magnetosphere. As neutral hydrogen and nitrogen escape from Triton's atmosphere, they form a large neutral cloud in orbit around Neptune called the Triton torus. The modelled rate of escape of hydrogen, both atomic and molecular, is about 7×10^{25} particles per second; nitrogen escape rates are inferred to be 2–3 times lower. The density of the neutral hydrogen torus is comparable, if not greater than that of the neutral hydrogen torus maintained by Titan. The ionization of neutral particles in the Triton torus and the escape of ions from Triton's atmosphere may act as the dominant source of plasma within Neptune's magnetosphere.

== Structure ==
Triton's atmosphere is well structured and global. The atmosphere extends up to 870 kilometers above the surface, where the exobase is located, and had a surface pressure of about 14 microbars as of 1989. This is only 1/70,000th of the surface pressure on Earth. The surface temperature was at least 35.6 K (−237.6 °C) because Triton's nitrogen ice is in the warmer, hexagonal crystalline state, and the phase transition between hexagonal and cubic nitrogen ice occurs at that temperature. An upper limit in the low 40s (K) can be set from vapor pressure equilibrium with nitrogen gas in Triton's atmosphere. The most likely temperature was 38±1 K as of 1989. In the 1990s it probably increased by about 1 K due to the general global warming as Triton approached the peak of its southern hemisphere summer (see below).

Convection near Triton's surface heated by the Sun creates a troposphere (a "weather region") rising to an altitude of about 8 km. In it temperature decreases with height reaching a minimum of about 36 K at the tropopause. There is no stratosphere, defined as a layer where heating from the warmer troposphere and thermosphere is balanced by radiative cooling. Higher regions include the thermosphere (8–850 km) and exosphere (above 850 km). In the thermosphere the temperature rises reaching a constant value of about 95 K above 300 km. The upper atmosphere continuously leaks into outer space due to the weak gravity of Triton. The loss rate is about 1×10^{25} nitrogen molecules per second, equivalent to about 0.3 kg/s.

== Weather and climate ==
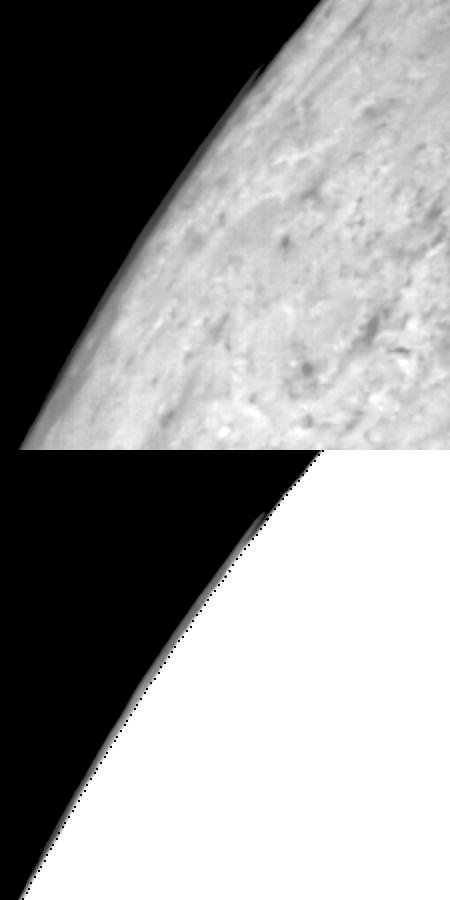
A cloud over the limb of Triton, taken by Voyager 2. The bottom image crops out Triton's horizon, making the thin clouds easier to see

Nitrogen ice particles form clouds in the troposphere a few kilometers above the surface of Triton. Above them a haze is present extending up to 30 km from the surface. It is believed to be composed largely of hydrocarbons and nitriles created by the action of the Sun's and stellar ultraviolet light on methane.

In 1989 Voyager 2 discovered that near the surface there are winds blowing to the east or north-east with a speed of about 5–15 m/s. Their direction was determined by observations of dark streaks located over the southern polar cap, which generally extend from the south-west to north-east. These winds are thought to be related to the sublimation of nitrogen ice from the southern cap as there was summer in the southern hemisphere in 1989. The gaseous nitrogen moves northward and is deflected by the Coriolis force to the east, forming an anticyclone near the surface. The tropospheric winds are capable of moving material of over a micrometer in size thus forming the streaks.

Eight kilometers high in the atmosphere near the tropopause, the winds change direction. They now flow to the west and are driven by differences in temperature between the poles and equator. These high winds may distort Triton's atmosphere making it asymmetric. An asymmetry was actually observed during star occultations by Triton in 1990s.

== Observations and exploration ==
=== Before Voyager 2 ===
Before Voyager 2 arrived, a nitrogen and methane atmosphere with a density as much as 30% that of Earth had been suggested. This proved to be a great overestimate, similar to the early predictions of the atmospheric density of Mars. However, also like on Mars, a denser early atmosphere is postulated.

=== Voyager 2 ===
Voyager 2 flew past Triton five hours after its closest approach to Neptune in late August 1989. During the flyby, Voyager 2 took measurements of the atmosphere, finding methane and nitrogen in the atmosphere. Voyager 2 also captured at least two plumes erupting through the nitrogen ice of Triton, and this is the first evidence of active plumes on an icy world such as Triton. The plumes were around 100 km long and 8 km above the surface and produced dark shadows in the images from Voyager 2. Around 100 dark surface fans on the SPT are attributed to the plumes. The vapor mass flux of the plumes is estimated to be around 400 kg/s per plume. They caused large amounts of dark substrate to be thrown through the thin nitrogen ice and then into the atmosphere. The plumes captured on Triton are similar to the plumes seen on Enceladus, and the modeled ejection speeds are more consistent with a deep source.

It has been suggested that the observed plumes are not of eruptive origin, but instead are dust devils, suggested due to the observed plumes' length-to-height ratio. The proposed mechanism for the formation of dust devils is that patches of the surface without nitrogen frost would heat up more quickly than the surrounding area. Given this and Triton's low surface pressure, the atmosphere would begin to heat up due to convection, to as much as 10 K greater than the surface temperature, allowing for the creation of dust devils with wind speeds of up to 20 meters per second. This could explain the observed surface temperature of 38 K, and remove the need to come up with a heating mechanism for the geysers. However, the dust devil hypothesis is largely unconsidered today, due to questions as to why more dust devils were not observed given their proposed formation and that the observed dark streaks and fans associated with the plumes do not require dust devils to explain them, as well as the fact the model relied upon an erroneous temperature profile for the atmosphere. As a result, eruptive-based models for the plumes are generally favored today.

=== Later observations ===
In the 1990s, observations from Earth were made of the occultation of stars by Triton's limb. These observations indicated the presence of a denser atmosphere than was inferred from Voyager 2 data. The surface pressure in the late 1990s is thought to have increased to at least 19 μbar or, possibly, even to 40 μbar. Other observations have shown an increase in temperature by 5% from 1989 to 1998. One of the scientists involved in investigation of Triton, James L. Elliot, said:

"At least since 1989, Triton has been undergoing a period of global warming. Percentage-wise, it's a very large increase."

These observations indicate Triton has a warm southern-hemisphere summer season that only happens once every few hundred years, near solstices. Hypotheses for this warming include the sublimation of frost on Triton's surface and a decrease in ice albedo, which would allow more heat to be absorbed. Another theory argues the changes in temperature are a result of the deposition of dark, red material from geological processes on the moon. Because Triton's bond albedo is among the highest within the solar system, it is sensitive to small variations in spectral albedo.

Further observations in 2008, 2017, and 2022 do not support the global warming trend on Triton. The warming trend in the southern hemisphere only continued until the year 2000, then the area returned to its 1989 temperatures by 2017 and stayed stable through the 2022 analysis. By taking measurements during specific events in 1989, 1995, 1997, 2008, 2017, and 2022, researchers were able to analyze and study how seasonal changes affect Triton's atmosphere and calculate complex seasonal cycles based on Triton's orbital precession of about 650 years. There are many mechanics that contribute to this cycle. First, both Neptune and Triton have complex and significant axial tilts. Triton's orbit is tilted about 23° relative to Neptune's equator. This substantial tilt pulls on Triton's orbit asymmetrically. Neptune's axis is tilted at about 28° relative to its orbit around the Sun. Additionally, as Triton orbits Neptune, the plane of its orbit slowly rotates due to retrograde motion. As Triton precesses about every 650 years, Neptune's axial tilt aligns with Triton's orbital tilt causing one of Triton's poles to point directly to the sun. By using the epoch from 1980 through 2020, scientists have been able to hypothesize that Triton's seasons last about 35 to 40 years and the entire seasonal cycle lasts about 140 to180 years. In addition, scientists were able to identify an intense summer season, with the subsolar latitude reaching about 50° South in 2000.

In 2021, the subsolar latitude was moving toward the equator and expected to be 36°, moving towards a moderate latitude of 20° and a low latitude of 5° at the far end of the seasonal cycle. In addition to calculating Triton's 650 year procession, scientists have also calculated the periods of low, moderate, and severe seasons with low mapping from years 2300 through 2400, moderate mapping from years 1500 through 1650, and severe mapping from years 1850 through 2200. With future exploration already being planned in hopes of gaining a better understanding of Triton and its atmosphere.

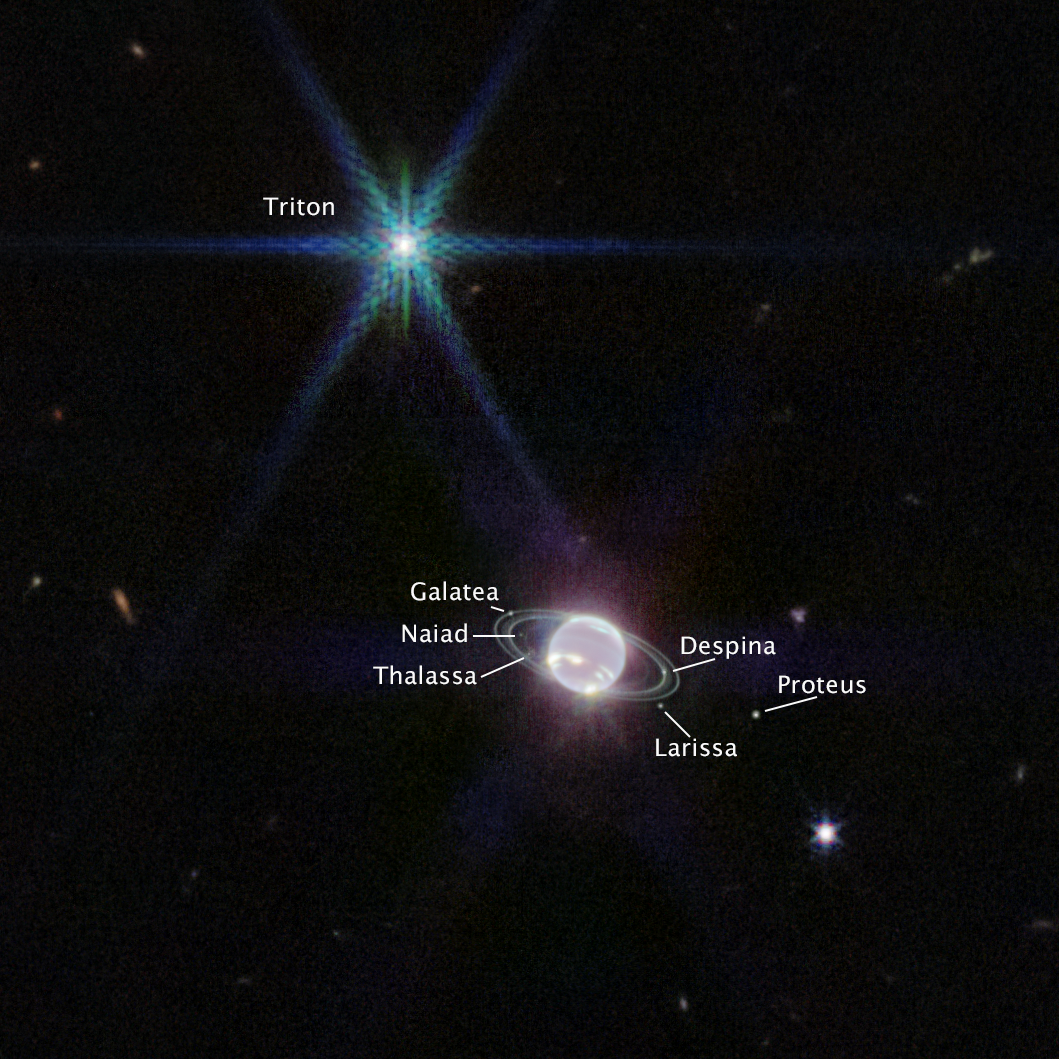
JWST captures new images of Neptune and its moons

=== James Webb Space Telescope ===
On July 12, 2022, the James Webb Space Telescope took pictures of Neptune and its moons. Triton is pictured as a large, bright blue, eight-pointed object. The brightness is due to Triton's icy atmosphere reflecting over 70% of sunlight back into space. The blue color is a result of JWST's NIRCam, near infrared camera, which has an infrared range of 0.6 to 5 microns. The NIRCam converted the infrared light from Triton to blue using the F140m filter indicating that the infrared light from Triton represents a visible light wavelength of 1.40 microns. The diffraction spike pattern is a consequence of the bright light bending around the edges of the James Webb Space Telescope. Only the brightest objects will show this diffraction spike pattern in images. In addition, the reason that Triton appears much brighter than Neptune is due to the methane gases on Neptune absorbing the infrared light.

==== Triton Watch ====
The Triton Watch program was a campaign involving astronomers to monitor changes in the atmosphere of Triton. It was launched under a grant from NASA.

=== Future exploration ===
==== Trident ====
Trident is a proposed NASA mission that is to further study Neptune's moon Triton. The proposed launch date of Trident is set for October 2025, arriving at the Neptune system by 2038. Triton is a probable ocean world of very high priority because of the glimpses of activity shown from the Voyager 2 flyby. The origin of the activity seen from Voyager is still unclear and this makes Triton very high on the list when it comes to investigating ocean planets. Trident would dramatically help in furthering knowledge of the atmosphere of Triton as well as the activity from the surface plumes captured in Voyager 2. It would also help gain knowledge on the surface level of the moon and shed light on the processes that go on there. This mission has three scientific goals it is trying to achieve, which are: if Triton has a subsurface ocean or if it has had an ocean in the past, to further understand what energy sources and sinks are at play with the resurfacing of Triton, and to investigate and study the organic constituents on Triton's surface. To find an ocean on Triton, magnetic induction techniques will be used. The presence of the saltiness of an ocean makes it conductive, which means it is detectable to magnetic induction techniques with a spacecraft in orbit. The salinity of the ocean is mostly acquired from differentiation from volatiles in rocks on the planet and it is thought that these volatiles are sodium chloride dominant. To help achieve these goals, Trident would be equipped with a plasma spectrometer, a high resolution infrared spectrometer with a spectral range up to 5μm, as well as many other instruments.

==== Neptune Odyssey mission ====
The Neptune Odyssey mission concept is a flagship-class orbiter equipped with atmospheric probes that is proposed to be sent into the Neptune–Triton system. This mission would launch around 2031 and would be aboard the SLS (Space Launch System) or an equivalent launch vehicle. The spacecraft would use a gravity assist from Jupiter and then cruise for 13 years to its destination in the Neptune–Triton system for its study. This mission will be trying to answer questions of: how do the interior and atmospheres of ice giants form and evolve; is Triton an ocean world; what is the cause of the plumes seen on Voyager 2; and how the geophysics of Triton can help expand the knowledge of dwarf planets such as Pluto. [1] Some measurements to be taken in this mission are: magnetic field, gravitational harmonics, spectroscopy, visible imager, ions and electrons, neutral mass spectrometry, and dust.

== See also ==
- Climate of Triton
- Atmosphere of Pluto
- Atmosphere of Titan
- Geology of Triton
