= Atmosphere of Pluto =

Layer of gases surrounding the dwarf planet Pluto

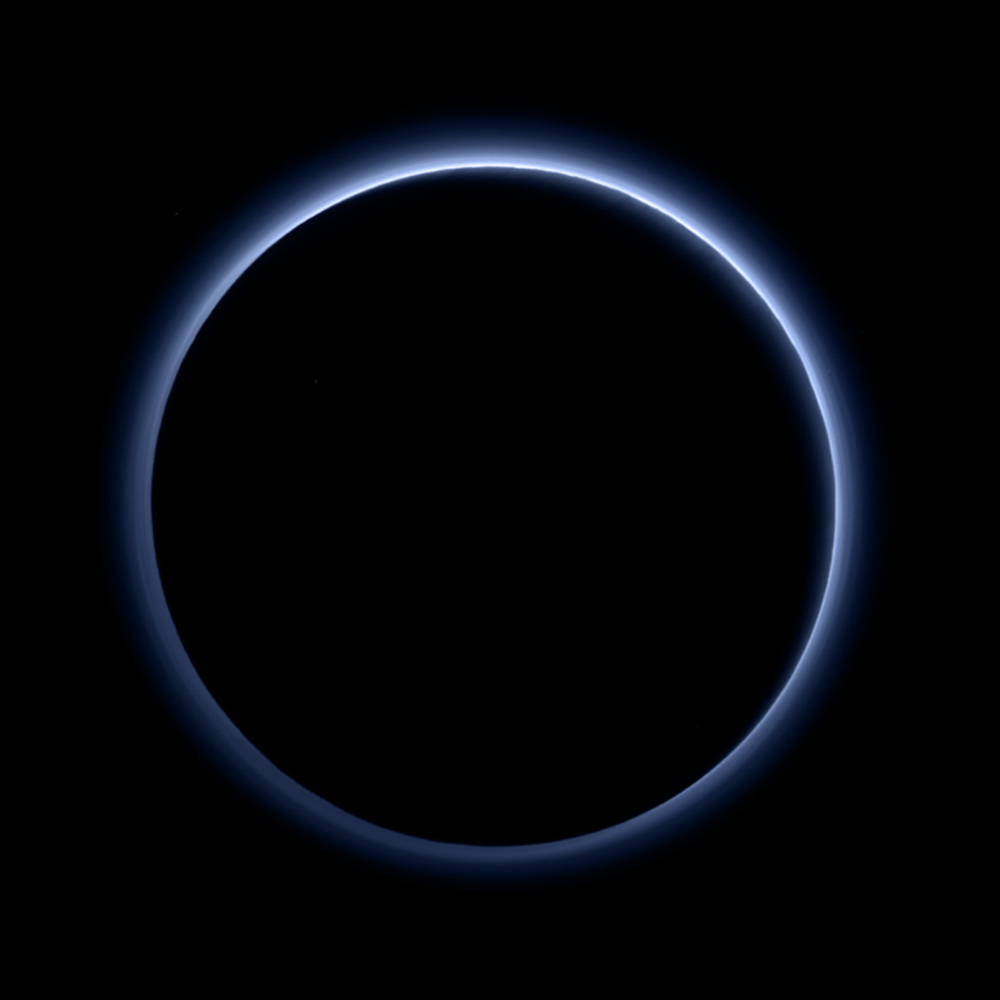
- Departure shot of Pluto by New Horizons, showing Pluto's atmosphere backlit by the Sun. The blue color is close to what a human eye would have seen, and is caused by layers of haze in the atmosphere

General information
- Height: ~1 700 km (exobase)
- Average surface pressure: 1.0 Pa (9.87×10^{−6} atm) (2015); 0.91 Pa (8.98×10^{−6} atm) (2020)

Composition (Note: Abundances of methane, acetylene, and ethylene are given by Stern and collaborators; abundances of carbon monoxide and hydrogen cyanide are given by Lellouch and collaborators)
- Nitrogen (N_{2}): >99%
- Methane (CH_{4}): 0.25%
- Carbon monoxide (CO): ~0.0515%
- Acetylene (C_{2}H_{2}): 0.0003%
- Ethylene (C_{2}H_{4}): 0.0001%
- Hydrogen cyanide (HCN): 10^{−5}-10^{−6}%

The atmosphere of Pluto is the layer of gases that surround the dwarf planet Pluto. It consists mainly of nitrogen (N_{2}), with minor amounts of methane (CH_{4}) and carbon monoxide (CO), all of which are produced by the sublimation of surface ices from Pluto's surface. It contains layered haze, probably consisting of heavier compounds which form from these gases due to high-energy radiation. The atmosphere of Pluto is notable for its strong and not completely understood seasonal changes caused by peculiarities of the orbital and axial rotation of Pluto.

The surface pressure of the atmosphere of Pluto, measured by New Horizons in 2015, is about 1 Pa (10 μbar), roughly 1/100,000 of Earth's atmospheric pressure. The temperature on the surface is 40 to 60 K (−230 to −210 °C), but it quickly rises with altitude due to a methane-generated greenhouse effect. Near the altitude of 30 km it reaches 110 K (−163 °C), but then slowly decreases with altitude.

Pluto is the first trans-Neptunian object with a confirmed atmosphere. (Note: The only other is (612533) 2002 XV93. There is evidence of gaseous methane on the dwarf planet Makemake, but it is unclear whether its methane comes from an atmosphere or temporary outgassing.) Its closest analog is the atmosphere of Triton, although in some aspects it resembles even the atmosphere of Mars.

The atmosphere of Pluto has been studied since the 1980s by way of Earth-based observation of occultations of stars by Pluto and spectroscopy. In 2015, it was studied from a close distance by the spacecraft New Horizons.

== Composition ==
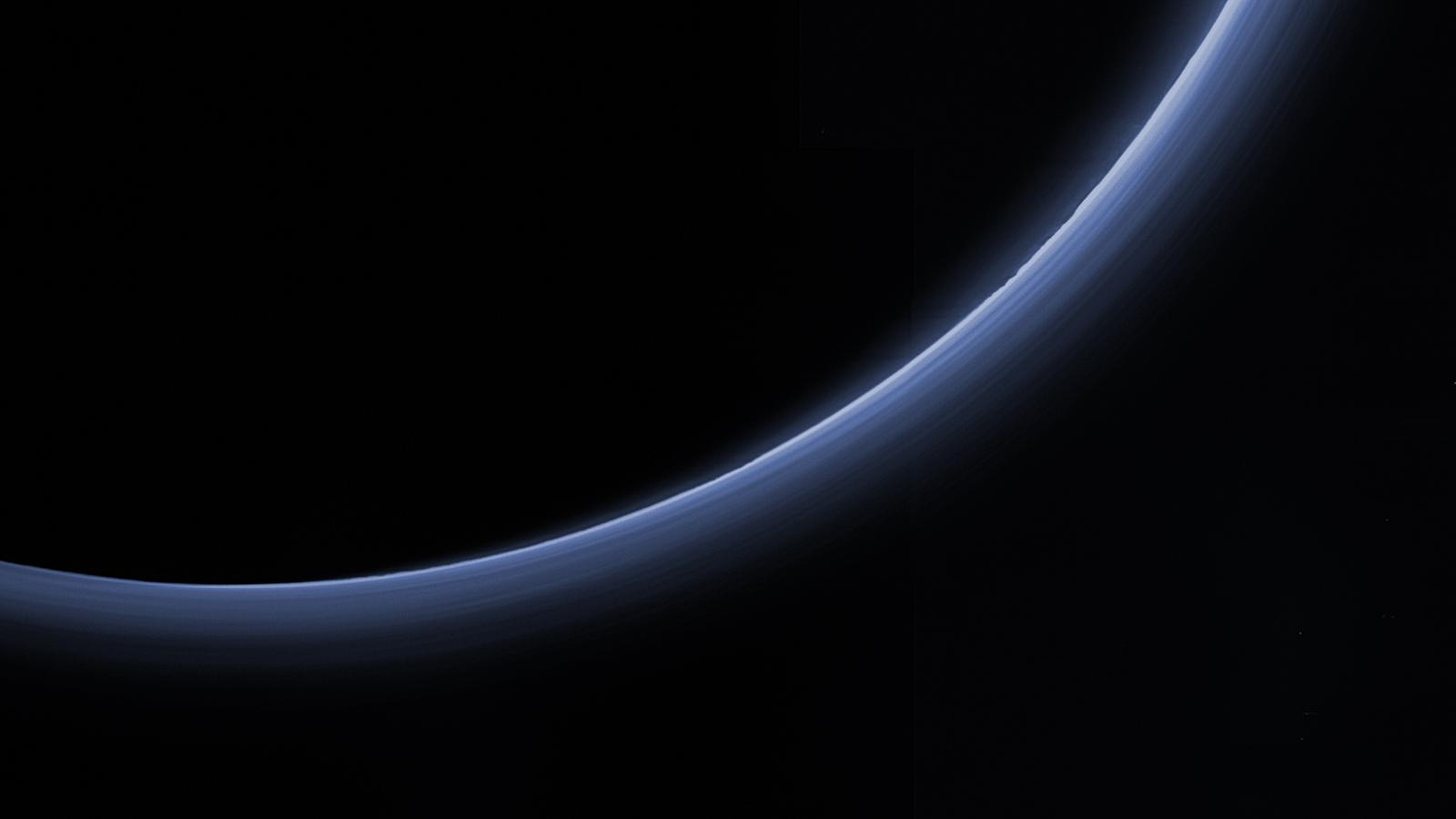
Blue haze bands in Pluto's atmosphere (approximately true-color)

The main component of the atmosphere of Pluto is nitrogen. The methane content, according to measurements by New Horizons, is 0.25%. (Note: Earth-based observations suggested about 0.4–0.6% in 2008 and 0.3–0.4% in 2012) For carbon monoxide, estimates are around 0.0515%. Under the influence of high-energy cosmic radiation, these gases react to form more complex compounds (not volatile at Pluto's surface temperatures), including ethane (C_{2}H_{6}), ethylene (C_{2}H_{4}, about 0.0001%), acetylene (C_{2}H_{2}, about 0.0003%), heavier hydrocarbons and nitriles and hydrogen cyanide (HCN) , These compounds slowly precipitate on the surface. They probably also include tholins, which are responsible for the brown color of Pluto (like some other bodies in the outer solar system).

The most volatile component of the atmosphere of Pluto is nitrogen, the second is carbon monoxide and the third is methane (CH_{4}. The indicator of volatility is saturated vapor pressure (sublimation pressure). At temperature 40 K (close to minimum value for surface of Pluto) it is about 10 Pa for nitrogen, 1 Pa for carbon monoxide and 0.001 Pa for methane. It quickly increases with temperature, and at 60 K (close to the maximum value) approaches 10 000 Pa, 3000 Pa and 10 Pa respectively. For heavier-than-methane hydrocarbons, water, ammonia, carbon dioxide and hydrogen cyanide, this pressure remains negligibly low (about 10^{−5} Pa or still lower), which indicates absence of volatility at Pluto's conditions (at least in cold lower atmosphere).

Methane and carbon monoxide, due to their lower abundance and volatility, could be expected to demonstrate stronger deviations from pressure equilibrium with surface ices and bigger temporal and spatial variations of concentration. But actually the concentration of methane, at least, does not vary noticeably with height (at least, in the lower 20–30 km), longitude or time. But temperature dependences of the volatilities of methane and nitrogen suggest that the concentration of methane will decrease as Pluto moves further from the Sun. It is notable that the observed concentration of methane is 2 orders of magnitude higher than expected from Raoult's law on the basis of its concentration in surface ice and the ratio of the sublimation pressures of methane and nitrogen. The reasons for this discrepancy are unknown. It could be due to the existence of separate patches of relatively clean methane ice, or due to an increased methane content in the uppermost layer of usual mixed ice.

Seasonal and orbital changes of insolation result in migration of surface ices: they sublimate in some places and condensate in others. According to some estimates, this causes meter-sized changes of their thickness. This, alongside changes in viewing geometry, results in appreciable changes in the brightness and color of Pluto.

Methane and carbon monoxide, despite their low abundance, are significant for the thermal structure of the atmosphere: methane is a strong heating agent and carbon monoxide is a cooling one (although the degree of cooling contributed by carbon monoxide is not completely clear).

== Haze ==
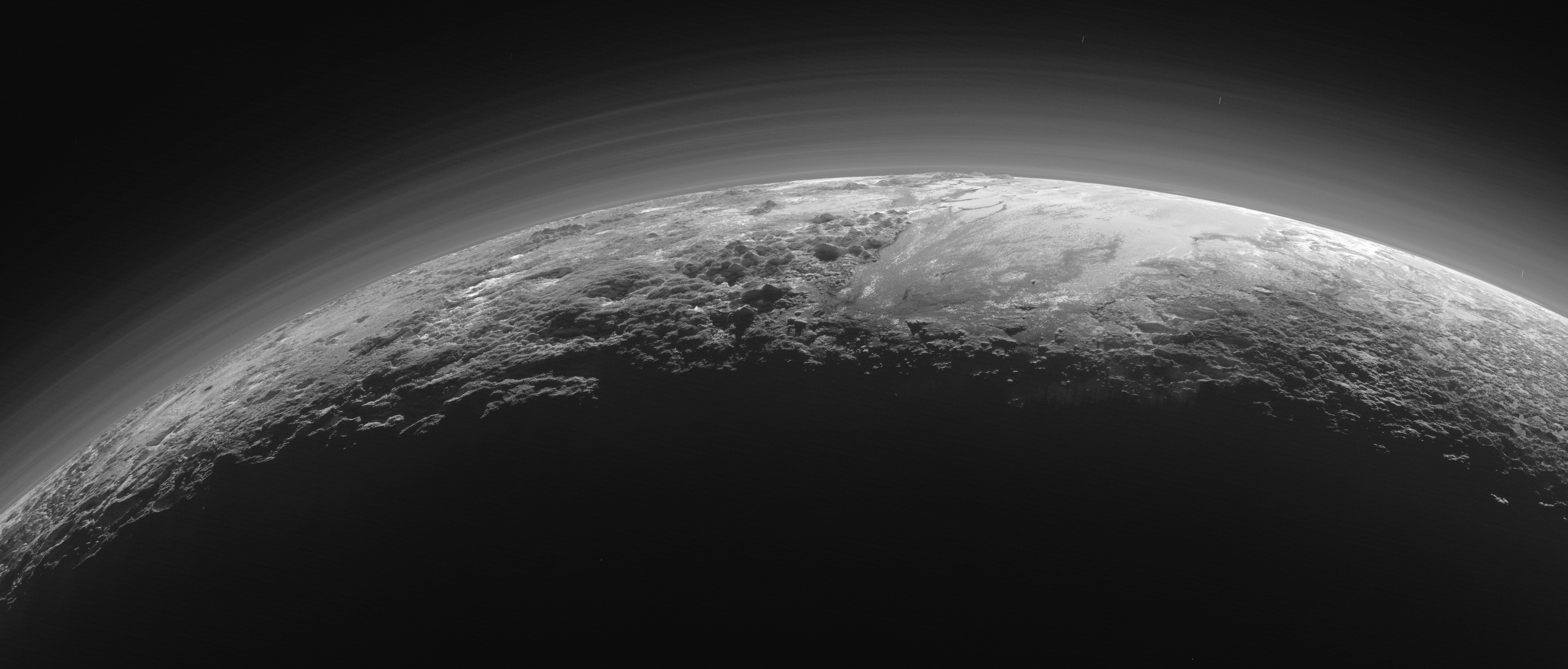
Haze with multiple layers in the atmosphere of Pluto. Part of the plain Sputnik Planitia with nearby mountains is seen below. Photo by New Horizons, taken 15 min after the closest approach to Pluto.

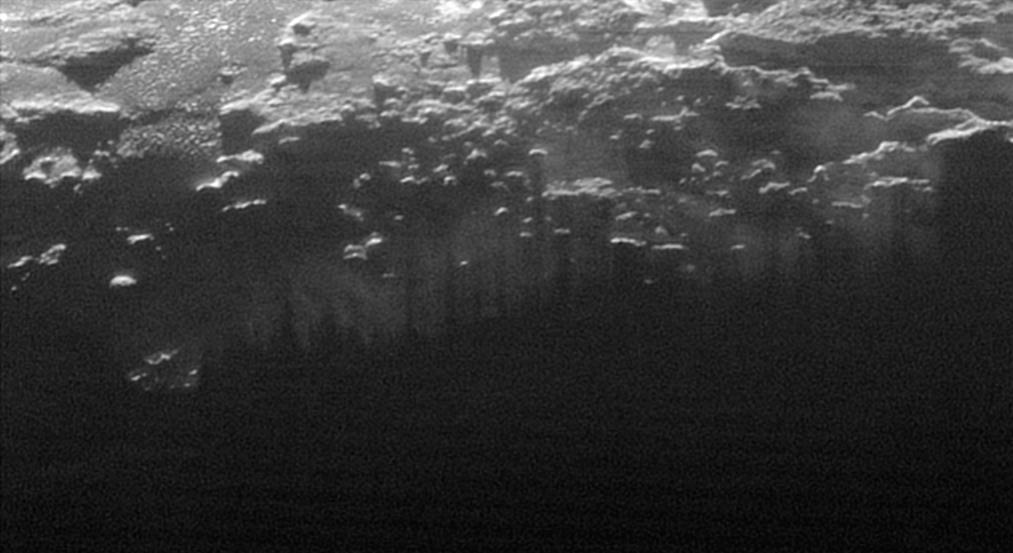
Mountain shadows on the haze

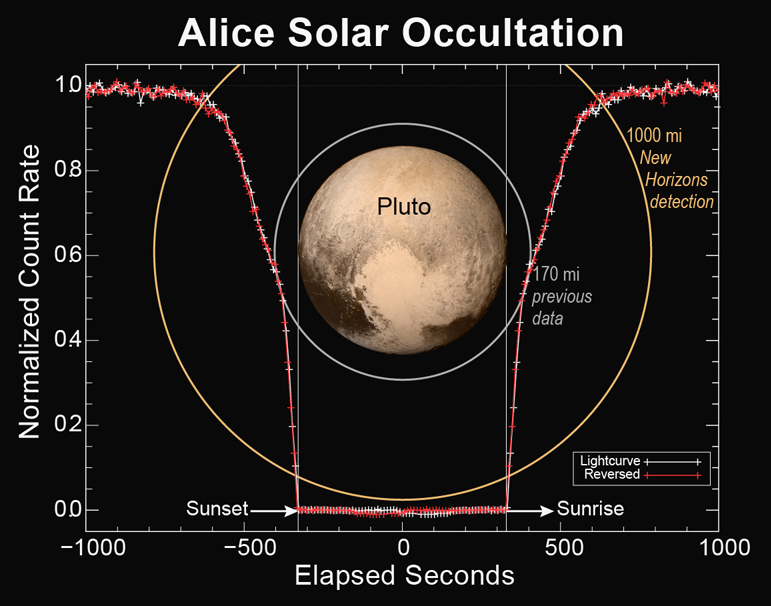
Curve of absorption of solar ultraviolet by the atmosphere of Pluto, measured during flight of New Horizons across Pluto's shadow. A distinctive kink, created, probably, by the haze, is present both on the decreasing and increasing branches.

New Horizons discovered in the atmosphere of Pluto a multi-layered haze, which covers the entirety of the dwarf planet and reaches altitudes over 200 km. The best images show about 20 layers of the haze. Horizontal extent of the layers is no less than 1000 km. The thickness of the layers varies from 1 to >10 km, and vertical distance between them is about 10 km. In northern regions the haze is 2-3 times denser than near the equator.

Despite the very low density of the atmosphere, the haze is rather appreciable: it even scatters enough light to allow photographing some details of Pluto's night side. Long shadows from mountains are seen on the haze. Its normal optical depth is estimated as 0.004 or 0.013 (thus, it diminishes the intensity of a vertical beam of light by $1 - e^{-0.004} \approx 0.4\%$ or $1-e^{-0.013} \approx 1.3\%$; for grazing light the effect is much stronger). Scale height of the haze is 45–55 km; it approximately coincides with scale height of pressure in the middle atmosphere. At the heights of 100–200 km it diminishes to 30 km.

Size of the haze particles is unclear. Its blue color points to a particle radius near 10 nm, but the ratio of brightnesses at different phase angles indicates a radius exceeding 100 nm. This can be explained by aggregation of small (tens of nm) particles into larger (hundreds of nm) clusters.

The haze probably consists of particles of non-volatile compounds, which are synthesized from atmospheric gases under influence of cosmic high-energy radiation. The layers show the presence of atmospheric waves (presence of which is also suggested by observations of occultations), and such waves can be created by wind blowing over Pluto's rough surface.

The haze is the most probable reason for a kink in the curve of light intensity vs. time obtained by New Horizons during the flight through Pluto's shadow (see image on right) – below altitude 150 km the atmosphere attenuates light much more strongly than above. A similar kink was observed during stellar occultation in 1988. It was initially interpreted as weakening of light by haze, but now it is thought to be mainly a result of a strong inverse temperature gradient in the lower atmosphere. During later occultations (when the atmosphere of Pluto was already ≥2 times denser) this kink was absent.

More evidence of the haze was obtained in 2002 due to a new occultation. The stellar light which reached Earth during the occultation (due to refraction in Pluto's atmosphere), demonstrated an increase in intensity with wavelength. (Note: At least, in the infrared range: from 0.75 to 2 μm.) This was interpreted as reliable evidence of light scattering by aerosols (similar to the reddening of the rising sun). However, this feature was absent during later occultations (including 29 June 2015), and on 14 July 2015, New Horizons found the haze to be blue.

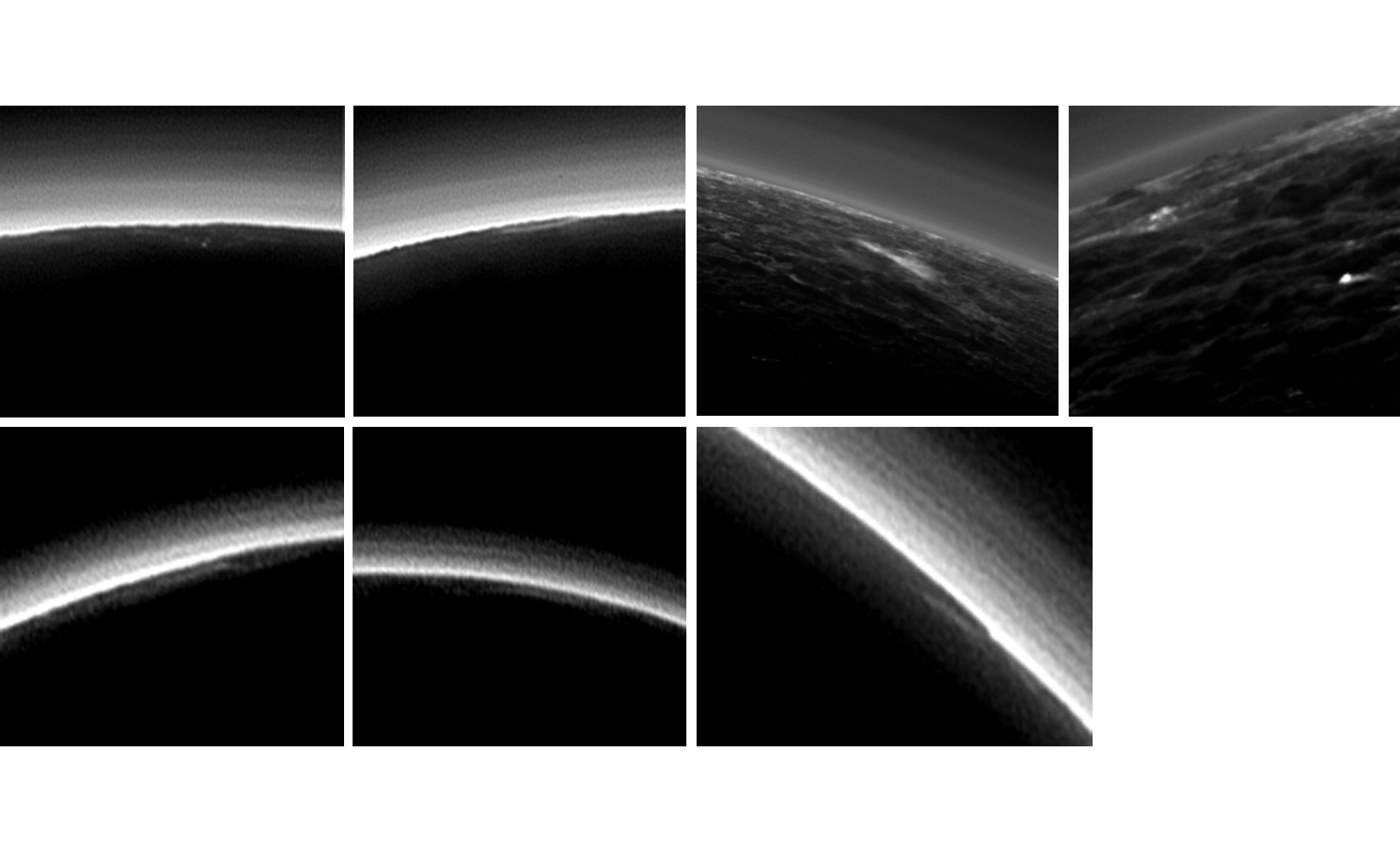
Possible clouds in Pluto's atmosphere

In the final batch of images received from New Horizons, a number of potential clouds were observed.

== Structure ==
Pluto has no or almost no troposphere; observations by New Horizons suggest only a thin tropospheric boundary layer. Its thickness in the place of measurement was 4 km, and the temperature was 37±3 K. The layer is not continuous.

Above it is a layer with rapid increase of temperature with height, the stratosphere. The temperature gradient is estimated by various sources to be 2.2, 3–15 or 5.5 degrees per km. This is a result of a greenhouse effect, caused by methane. The mean temperature of the surface is 42±4 K (measured in 2005), and the mean value for the whole atmosphere is 90^{+25}_{−18} K (2008).

At height 20–40 km the temperature reaches its maximum (100–110 K; stratopause) and then slowly decreases (about 0.2 K/km; mesosphere). Causes of this decrease are unclear; it could be related to the cooling effect of carbon monoxide, or hydrogen cyanide, or other reasons. Above 200 km the temperature reaches approximately 80 K and then remains constant.

The temperature of the upper layers of the atmosphere does not show noticeable temporal changes. In 1988, 2002 and 2006 it was approximately constant and equal to 100 K (with uncertainty about 10 K), despite a twofold increase in pressure. Dependence on latitude or morning/evening conditions is also absent: temperature is the same above every part of the surface. It is consistent with theoretical data, which predict fast mixing of the atmosphere. But there is evidence for small vertical heterogeneities in temperature. They reveal themselves in sharp and brief spikes of brightness during stellar occultations. Amplitude of these heterogeneities is estimated to be 0.5–0.8 K on the scale of a few km. They can be caused by atmospheric gravity waves or turbulence, which can be related to convection or wind.

Interaction with the atmosphere significantly influences the temperature of the surface. Calculations show that the atmosphere, despite its very low pressure, can significantly diminish diurnal variations in temperature. But there still remain temperature variations of about 20 K – partly because of cooling of the surface due to sublimation of ices.

== Pressure ==
The pressure of the atmosphere of Pluto is very low and strongly time-dependent. Observations of stellar occultations by Pluto show that it increased about 3 times between 1988 and 2015, even though Pluto has been moving away from the Sun since 1989. This is probably caused by Pluto's north pole coming into sunlight in 1987, which intensified evaporation of nitrogen from the northern hemisphere, (Note: In these sources this pole is called "south" according to nomenclature of that time.) whereas its southern pole is still too warm for condensation of nitrogen. Absolute values of surface pressure are difficult to obtain from occultation data, because this data does not usually reach the lowest layers of the atmosphere. So, surface pressure has to be extrapolated, and this is somewhat ambiguous due to the height dependence of temperature and, consequently, pressure not being completely clear. The radius of Pluto must also be known, but it was poorly constrained before 2015. So, precise values of Pluto's surface pressure were impossible to calculate in previous times. For some occultations since 1988, pressure was calculated for a reference level of 1275 km from the center of Pluto (which later turned out to be 88±4 km from the surface).

Curves of pressure vs. distance from the center, obtained from occultations in 1988 and 2002, in combination with the now known radius of Pluto (1187±4 km) give values of about 0.4 Pa for 1988 and 1.0 Pa for 2002. Spectral data provided values 0.94 Pa in 2008 and 1.23 Pa in 2012 for the distance from the center 1188 km (1±4 km from the surface). An occultation on 4 May 2013 gave data almost precisely for the surface level (1190 km from the center, or 3±4 km from the surface): 1.13±0.007 Pa. An occultation on 29/30 June 2015, just 2 weeks before New Horizons encounter, provided a surface pressure of 1.3±0.1 Pa.

The first direct and reliable data about the lowermost layers of the atmosphere of Pluto were obtained by New Horizons on 14 July 2015 from radio-occultation measurements. The surface pressure was estimated to be 1 Pa (1.1±0.1 at entry of the spacecraft behind Pluto and 1.0±0.1 at the exit). This is consistent with occultation data from previous years, although some of the previous calculations based on this data gave about 2 times higher results.

The stellar occultation on 17 July 2019 has shown Pluto's atmospheric pressure have dropped about 30% from maximal values in 2015, reaching 0.967^{+0.053}_{−0.034} Pa. 6 June 2020 further pressure decline to 0.91±0.03 Pa was measured.

The scale height of pressure in Pluto's atmosphere varies significantly with height (in other words, the height dependence of the pressure deviates from exponential). This is caused by strong height variations of temperature. For the lowermost layer of the atmosphere the scale height is about 17–19 km, and for heights 30–100 km — 50–70 km.

== Seasonal changes ==
Due to orbital eccentricity, in the aphelion Pluto receives 2.8 times less heat than in perihelion. (Note: Given by the square of the ratio of the aphelion $Q$ and perihelion $q$ distances: $(Q/q)^2$) It should cause strong changes in its atmosphere, although details of these processes are not clear. Firstly it was thought that in aphelion the atmosphere must largely freeze out and fall on the surface (this is suggested by strong temperature dependence of sublimation pressure of its compounds), but more elaborated models predict that Pluto has a significant atmosphere year-round.

Pluto's last passage through its perihelion was on 5 September 1989. As of 2015, it is moving away from the Sun and its overall surface illumination is decreasing. However, the situation is complicated by its big axial tilt (122.5°), which results in long polar days and nights on large parts of its surface. Shortly before the perihelion, on 16 December 1987, Pluto underwent equinox, and its north pole (Note: Due to reverse direction of axial rotation of Pluto, naming of its poles is somewhat ambiguous. Since 2009, International Astronomical Union defines north (more precisely, positive) pole of Pluto on basis of direction of the rotation: it is that pole, from whose side Pluto appears to rotate counterclockwise (Archinal et al., 2011). It is oriented to southern side of the solar system.) came out of the polar night, which had lasted 124 Earth years.

Data, existing as of 2014, allowed the scientists to build a model of seasonal changes in Pluto's atmosphere. During the previous aphelion (1865) significant quantity of volatile ices were present in both the northern and southern hemispheres. Approximately at the same time, the equinox occurred and the southern hemisphere became tilted towards the Sun. Local ices began to migrate to the northern hemisphere, and around 1900 the southern Hemisphere became largely devoid of ices. After the following equinox (1987), the southern hemisphere turned away from the Sun. Nonetheless, its surface was already substantially heated, and its big thermal inertia (provided by non-volatile water ice) greatly slowed down its cooling. That is why gases, which now intensively evaporate from northern hemisphere, cannot quickly condense in the southern, and keep accumulating in the atmosphere, increasing its pressure. Around 2035–2050, the southern hemisphere will cool enough to permit intensive condensation of the gases, and they will migrate there from the northern hemisphere, where is polar day. It will last till equinox near aphelion (about 2113). The northern hemisphere will not lose its volatile ices completely, and their evaporation will supply the atmosphere even at the aphelion. The overall change of atmospheric pressure in this model is about 4 times; the minimum was reached near 1970–1980, and the maximum will be near 2030. The full temperature range is only several degrees.

In July 2019, an occultation by Pluto showed that its atmospheric pressure, against expectations, had fallen by 20% since 2016. In 2021, astronomers at the Southwest Research Institute confirmed the result using data from an occultation in 2018, which showed that light was appearing less gradually from behind Pluto's disc, indicating a thinning atmosphere.

== Escape ==
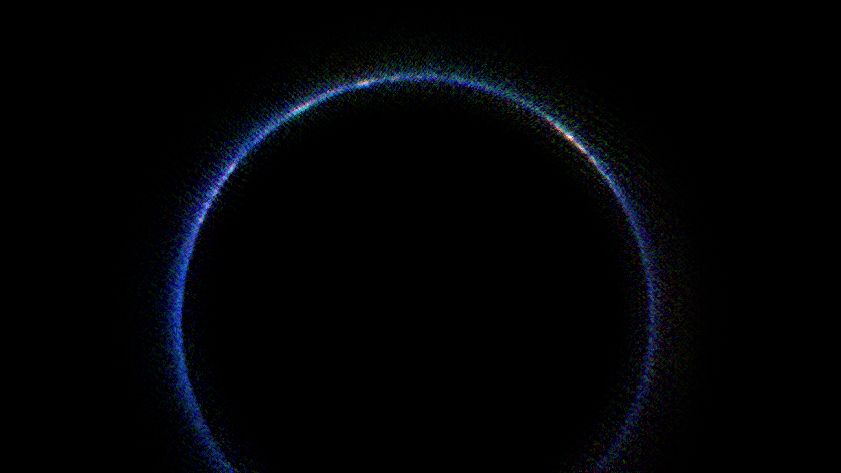
Atmosphere of Pluto in infrared (New Horizons). The whitish patches are sunlight bouncing off more reflective or smoother areas on Pluto's surface.

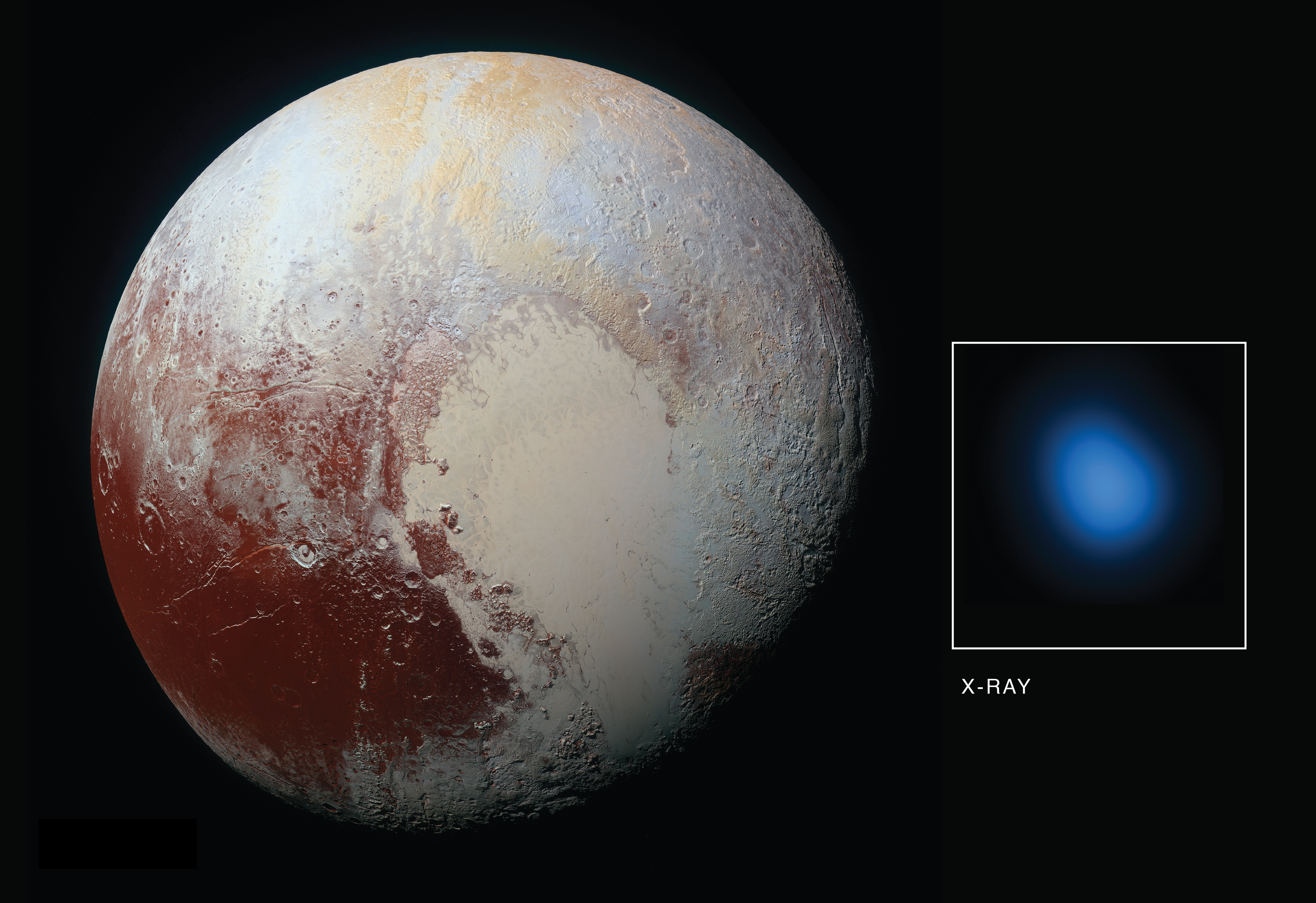
Image of Pluto in X-rays by Chandra X-ray Observatory (blue spot). The X-rays are probably created by interaction of the gases surrounding Pluto with solar wind, although details of their origin are not clear.

Early data suggested that Pluto's atmosphere loses 10^{27}–10^{28} molecules (50–500 kg) of nitrogen per second, an amount corresponding to the loss of a surface layer of volatile ices several hundred meters or several kilometers thick during the lifetime of the Solar System. However, subsequent data from New Horizons revealed that this figure was overestimated by at least four orders of magnitude; Pluto's atmosphere is currently losing only 1×10^{23} molecules of nitrogen and 5×10^{25} molecules of methane every second. This presumes a loss of several centimeters of nitrogen ice and several dozen meters of methane ice during the lifetime of the Solar System.

Molecules with high enough velocity, which escape into outer space, are ionized by solar ultraviolet radiation. As the solar wind encounters the obstacle formed by the ions, it is slowed and diverted, possibly forming a shock wave upstream of Pluto. The ions are "picked up" by the solar wind and carried in its flow past the dwarf planet to form an ion or plasma tail. The Solar Wind around Pluto (SWAP) instrument on the New Horizons spacecraft made the first measurements of this region of low-energy atmospheric ions shortly after its closest approach on 14 July 2015. Such measurements will enable the SWAP team to determine the rate at which Pluto loses its atmosphere and, in turn, will yield insight into the evolution of Pluto's atmosphere and surface.

The reddish-brown cap of the north pole of Charon, the largest of Pluto's moons (Neverland Regio), may be composed of tholins, organic macromolecules produced from methane, nitrogen and other gases released from the atmosphere of Pluto and transferred over about 19,000 km (12,000 mi) distance to the orbiting moon. Models show that Charon can receive about 2.5% of gases lost by Pluto.

== History of study ==
As early as the 1940s, Gerard Kuiper searched for evidence of the atmosphere in the spectrum of Pluto, without success. In the 1970s, some astronomers forwarded the hypothesis of a thick atmosphere and even oceans of neon: according to some views of those times, all other gases that are abundant in the Solar System would either freeze or escape. However, this hypothesis was based on a heavily overestimated mass of Pluto. No observational data about its atmosphere and chemical composition existed at the time.

The first strong, though indirect evidence of the atmosphere appeared in 1976. Infrared photometry by the 4-meter Nicholas U. Mayall Telescope revealed methane ice on Pluto's surface, which must sublimate significantly at Plutonian temperatures.

The atmosphere was proven to exist in 1988 via stellar occultation. If a star is occulted by a body without an atmosphere, its light disappears sharply, but occultations by Pluto show a gradual decrease. This is mainly due to atmospheric refraction (not absorption or scattering). The first such observations were made on 19 August 1985 by Noah Brosch and Haim Mendelson of the Wise Observatory in Israel. However, the data quality was rather low due to unfavorable observational conditions (in addition, the detailed description was published only 10 years later). On 9 June 1988, the existence of the atmosphere was convincingly proven by occultation observations from eight sites (the best data were obtained by the Kuiper Airborne Observatory). Scale height of the atmosphere was measured, making it possible to calculate the ratio of the temperature to the mean molecular mass. The temperature and pressure themselves were impossible to calculate at the time due to an absence of data on the chemical composition of the atmosphere and a large uncertainty in the radius and mass of Pluto.

The question of composition was answered in 1992 via infrared spectra of Pluto by the 3.8-meter United Kingdom Infrared Telescope. The surface of Pluto turned out to be covered mainly by nitrogen ice. Since nitrogen is, in addition, more volatile than methane, this observation implied a prevalence of nitrogen also in the atmosphere (although gaseous nitrogen was not seen in the spectrum). Furthermore, a small admixture of frozen carbon monoxide was discovered. The same year observations by the 3.0-meter NASA Infrared Telescope Facility revealed the first conclusive evidence of gaseous methane.

Understanding the state of the atmosphere requires knowing the surface temperature. Best estimates are derived from measurements of thermal emission of Pluto. The first values, calculated in 1987 from observations by IRAS, were about 55–60 K, with subsequent studies suggesting 30–40 K. In 2005, observations by the Submillimeter Array succeeded in distinguishing the emissions of Pluto and Charon, and the average temperature of Pluto's surface was measured to be 42±4 K (−231±4 °C). It was approximately 10 K colder than expected; the difference may be due to cooling from the sublimation of nitrogen ice. Further research revealed that the temperature is strongly different in different regions: from 40 to 55–60 K.

Around the year 2000, Pluto entered star-rich fields of the Milky Way, where it will reside until the 2020s. The first stellar occultations after 1988 were observed on 20 July and 21 August 2002 by teams led by Bruno Sicardy of the Paris Observatory and James L. Elliot of MIT. Atmospheric pressure turned out to be about two times higher than in 1988. The next occultation observed was on 12 June 2006, with later ones occurring more frequently. Processing of these data shows that the pressure continues to increase. An occultation of an exceptionally bright star, about 10 times brighter than the Sun itself, was observed on 29/30 June 2015 from the Beverly-Begg Observatory in Dunedin and the BOOTES-3 station at NIWA's Lauder Research Station – only 2 weeks before the New Horizons encounter.

On 14 July 2015, the New Horizons spacecraft made the first explorations of the atmosphere of Pluto from close distance, including radio occultation measurements and observations of weakening of solar radiation during flight through Pluto's shadow. It provided the first direct measurements of parameters of the lower atmosphere. The surface pressure turned out to be 1.0–1.1 Pa.

== See also ==
- Climate zones on Pluto
- Atmosphere of Triton
