= List of geological features on Charon =

Annotated map of Charon, with all IAU-approved names for features as of 2 February 2026, with some unofficial surface features in bold and italics

The geological features of Charon, the largest moon of Pluto, are being mapped by scientists using data from the New Horizons spacecraft. The team has given provisional names to the most prominent.

As of April 2020, only some of the names have been officially recognized by the International Astronomical Union, which has agreed that names for features on Charon should come from the following:

- Destinations and milestones of fictional space and other exploration.
- Fictional and mythological vessels of space and other exploration.
- Fictional and mythological voyagers, travellers and explorers.
- Authors and artists associated with space exploration, especially Pluto and the Kuiper Belt.

Some features discovered by the New Horizons mission have been given provisional names based on various science fiction and fantasy franchises, including Star Wars, Star Trek, Doctor Who, Alien, Firefly, and Macross. These names remain unofficial until accepted by the IAU.

On 11 April 2018, the IAU announced that several of the feature names had been officially recognized. As of December 2025, this list contains 55 geological features, 14 of which are official.

== Chasmata ==
A chasma (plural chasmata) is a deep, elongated, steep-sided depression. Charonian chasmata are named after vessels in fiction. The following is a list of official and unofficial names chosen by the New Horizons team. Names that have been officially approved are labeled as such.

| Feature | Named after | Details | Approval |
|---|---|---|---|
| Argo Chasma | Argo | Ship in the Greek myth of Jason and the Argonauts, as well as the spaceship in the English translation of the Space Battleship Yamato anime series | 2018-04-11 · WGPSN |
| Caleuche Chasma | Caleuche | Mythological ghost ship that travels the seas around the small island of Chiloé Island, off the coast of Chile, collecting the dead, who then live aboard it forever | 2018-04-11 · WGPSN |
| Macross Chasma | SDF-1 Macross | Spaceship in the Macross anime series | — |
| Mandjet Chasma | Mandjet | Solar boat of the ancient Egyptian sun god Ra | 2018-04-11 · WGPSN |
| Nostromo Chasma | Nostromo | Spaceship in the Alien films | — |
| Serenity Chasma | Serenity | Spaceship in the Firefly series | — |
| Tardis Chasma | TARDIS | Spaceship/timeship in the Doctor Who series | — |

== Craters ==
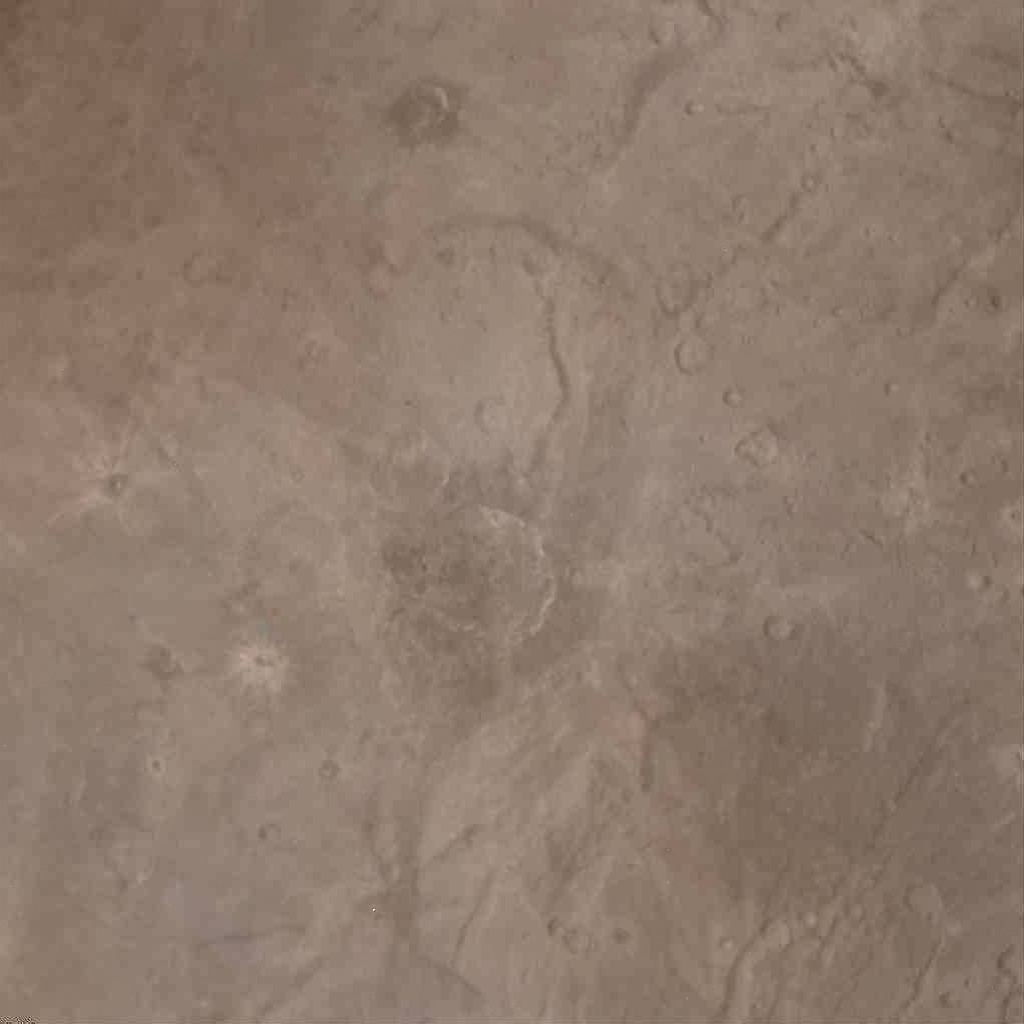
Photo of Charon centered on Ripley Crater. Nostromo Chasma crosses Ripley vertically. Vader is the dark crater at 12:00, Organa Crater is at 9:00, Skywalker Crater at 8:00, Gallifrey Macula and Tardis Chasma at 4:00.

Craters on Charon are named after characters associated with science fiction and fantasy. The following is a list of official and unofficial names chosen by the New Horizons team. Names that have been officially approved are labeled as such.

| Feature | Named after | Details | Approval |
|---|---|---|---|
| Ahab | Captain Ahab | Protagonist of Moby-Dick by Herman Melville | — |
| Alice | Alice | Protagonist of two novels by Lewis Carroll | — |
| Arroway | Eleanor Arroway | Protagonist of Contact by Carl Sagan | — |
| Beowolf | Beowulf | Protagonist of the Old English poem of the same name | — |
| Candide | Candide | Protagonist of the French satire of the same name written by Voltaire | — |
| Cunegonde | Cunégonde | Character in Candide by Voltaire | — |
| Cora | Cora | Protagonist of The Underground Railroad by Colson Whitehead | 2020-08-05 · WGPSN |
| Dinga | | | — |
| Dorothy | Dorothy Gale | Protagonist of the Oz novels by L. Frank Baum | 2018-04-11 · WGPSN |
| Fierro | | | — |
| Finn | Huckleberry Finn | Protagonist of the novel of the same name by Mark Twain | — |
| Guildenstern | Guildenstern | Character in Hamlet by William Shakespeare | — |
| Jim | Jim | Character in Adventures of Huckleberry Finn by Mark Twain | — |
| Kaguya-Hime | Kaguya-Hime | Princess from the Moon in a Japanese folk tale | — |
| Kersain | | | — |
| Kukudmi | Kakudmi | Character in the Hindu epic narrative Mahabharata | — |
| Kirk | James T. Kirk | Character in the Star Trek series | — |
| Lāčplēsis | Lāčplēsis | Character in the epic poem of the same name by Andrejs Pumpurs | — |
| Madoc | Madoc | Welsh prince in folklore who sailed to the Americas in 1170, over 300 years before Columbus | — |
| Nasreddin | Nasreddin | Sufi traveller in folklore | 2018-04-11 · WGPSN |
| Nemo | Captain Nemo | Character in two novels by Jules Verne | 2018-04-11 · WGPSN |
| Organa | Leia Organa | Character in the Star Wars films | — |
| Pangloss | Pangloss | Character in Candide by Voltaire | — |
| Panza | Sancho Panza | Character in Don Quixote by Miguel de Cervantes Saavedra | — |
| Pirx | Pilot Pirx | Main character in a short story cycle by Stanisław Lem | 2018-04-11 · WGPSN |
| Revati | Revati | Main character in the Hindu epic narrative Mahabharata | 2018-04-11 · WGPSN |
| Rosencrantz | Rosencrantz | Character in Hamlet by William Shakespeare | — |
| Ripley | Ellen Ripley | Character in the Alien films | — |
| Sadko (Note: "Sadko Crater" was originally the name of a crater right to the northeast of Beowolf crater before this crater received its official name. As of December 2025, that crater remains unnamed.) | Sadko | Adventurer who traveled to the bottom of the sea in the medieval Russian epic Bylina | 2018-04-11 · WGPSN |
| Skywalker | Luke Skywalker | Character in the Star Wars films | — |
| Spock | Spock | Character in the Star Trek series | — |
| Sundiata | Sundiata Keita | Founder and first king of the Mali Empire, also the protagonist of the Malinke epic of the same name | — |
| Sulu | Hikaru Sulu | Character in the Star Trek series | — |
| Tarō | | | — |
| Tichy | Ijon Tichy | Main character in short stories by Stanisław Lem | — |
| Tintin | Tintin | Character in the comic series of the same name by Hergé | — |
| Uhura | Nyota Uhura | Character in the Star Trek series | — |
| Utnapishtim | Utnapishtim | Character in the Epic of Gilgamesh | — |
| Vader | Darth Vader | Character in the Star Wars films | — |

== Dorsa ==
A dorsum (plural dorsa) is a ridge. Charon's only dorsum is named after an author. The following is a list of official and unofficial names chosen by the New Horizons team. Names that have been officially approved are labeled as such.

| Feature | Named after | Details | Approval |
|---|---|---|---|
| McCaffrey Dorsum | Anne McCaffrey | American-Irish science fiction author, best known for the Dragonriders of Pern series | 2020-08-05 · WGPSN |

== Maculae ==
A macula (plural maculae) is a dark spot. Charonian maculae are named after fictional destinations. The following is a list of official and unofficial names chosen by the New Horizons team. Names that have been officially approved are labeled as such.

| Feature | Named after | Details | Approval |
|---|---|---|---|
| Gallifrey Macula | Gallifrey | Planet in the Doctor Who series | — |

== Montes ==
A mons (plural montes) is a mountain. Montes on Charon are named after authors and artists. The following is a list of official and unofficial names chosen by the New Horizons team. Names that have been officially approved are labeled as such.

| Feature | Named after | Details | Approval |
|---|---|---|---|
| Butler Mons | Octavia E. Butler | Science fiction author | 2018-04-11 · WGPSN |
| Clarke Montes | Arthur C. Clarke | Science fiction author | 2018-04-11 · WGPSN |
| Kubrick Mons | Stanley Kubrick | Film director | 2018-04-11 · WGPSN |

== Planitiae ==
A planitia (plural planitiae) is a large plain. Charon's only planitia is named after a fictional destination. The following is a list of official and unofficial names chosen by the New Horizons team. Names that have been officially approved are labeled as such.

| Feature | Named after | Details | Approval |
|---|---|---|---|
| Vulcan Planitia | Vulcan | Planet in the Star Trek series | — |

== Regiones ==
A regio (plural regiones) is a region geographically distinct from its surroundings. Charon's only regio is named after a fictional destination. The following is a list of official and unofficial names chosen by the New Horizons team. Names that have been officially approved are labeled as such.

| Feature | Named after | Details | Approval |
|---|---|---|---|
| Neverland Regio (Note: Like Belton Regio and the "Brass Knuckles" on Pluto, Neverland Regio was originally a macula, informally named Mordor Macula, but was given an official name as a Regio.) | Neverland | A fictional island, the destination of Peter Pan and the Darling children in the novel and play by M. Barrie | 2026-02-02 · WGPSN |

== Terrae ==
A terra (plural terrae) is an extensive landmass or highland. Charon's only terra is named after a fictional destination. The following is a list of official and unofficial names chosen by the New Horizons team. Names that have been officially approved are labeled as such.

| Feature | Named after | Details | Approval |
|---|---|---|---|
| Oz Terra | Land of Oz | The setting for L. Frank Baum's The Wonderful Wizard of Oz children's novel | — |

== Valles ==
A vallis (plural valles) is valley. Charon's only vallis is named after a vessel in fiction. The following is a list of official and unofficial names chosen by the New Horizons team. Names that have been officially approved are labeled as such.

| Feature | Named after | Details | Approval |
|---|---|---|---|
| Matahourua Vallis | Matahourua | Canoe used by the legendary hero Kupe in Māori tradition | — |

== See also ==
- Geology of Charon
- List of geological features on Pluto
