= Geology of Charon =

Geologic structure and composition of Charon

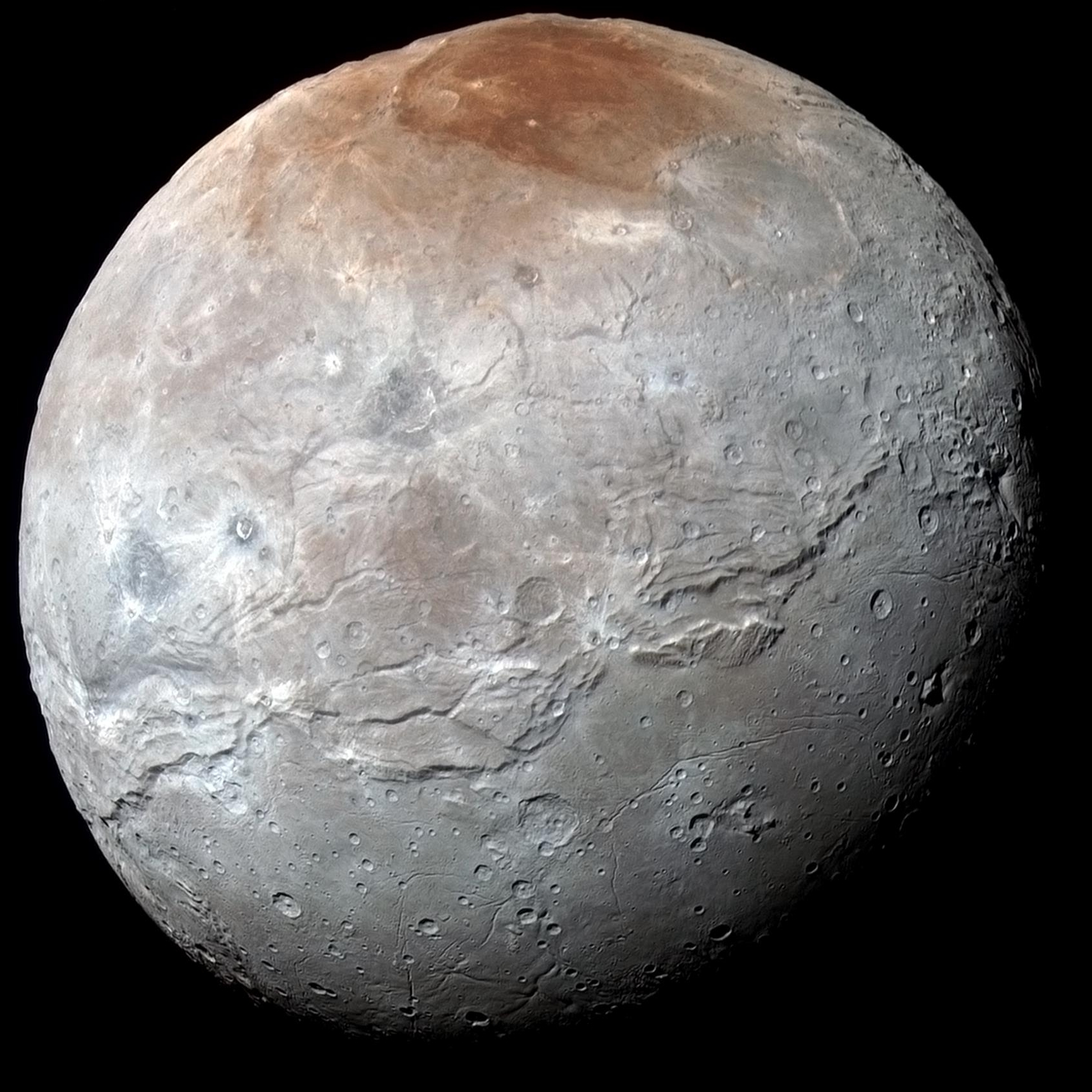
New Horizons enhanced-color image of Charon showing craters, grooves, and a depression with a mountain

The geology of Charon encompasses the characteristics of the surface, crust, and interior of Pluto's moon Charon. Like the geology of Pluto, almost nothing was known of Charon's geology until the New Horizons of the Pluto system on 14 July 2015. Charon's diameter is 1,208 km (751 mi)—just over half that of Pluto. Charon is sufficiently massive to have collapsed into a spheroid under its own gravity.

== History ==
Mutual eclipses of Pluto and Charon in the 1980s allowed astronomers to take spectra of Pluto and then the combined spectrum of the pair. By subtracting Pluto's spectrum from the total, astronomers were able to spectroscopically determine the surface composition of Charon. The northern regions of Charon are composed partially of hydrocarbons and tholins, whereas the lower latitudes are more diverse in composition.

Researchers from NASA's Ames Research Center in 2017 confirmed that icy plate tectonism occurred in the past, giving rise to many of its more prominent geological features, observing evidence of subduction of tectonic plates while also noting the absence of orogeny resulting from the freezing of the mantle.

== Surface ==
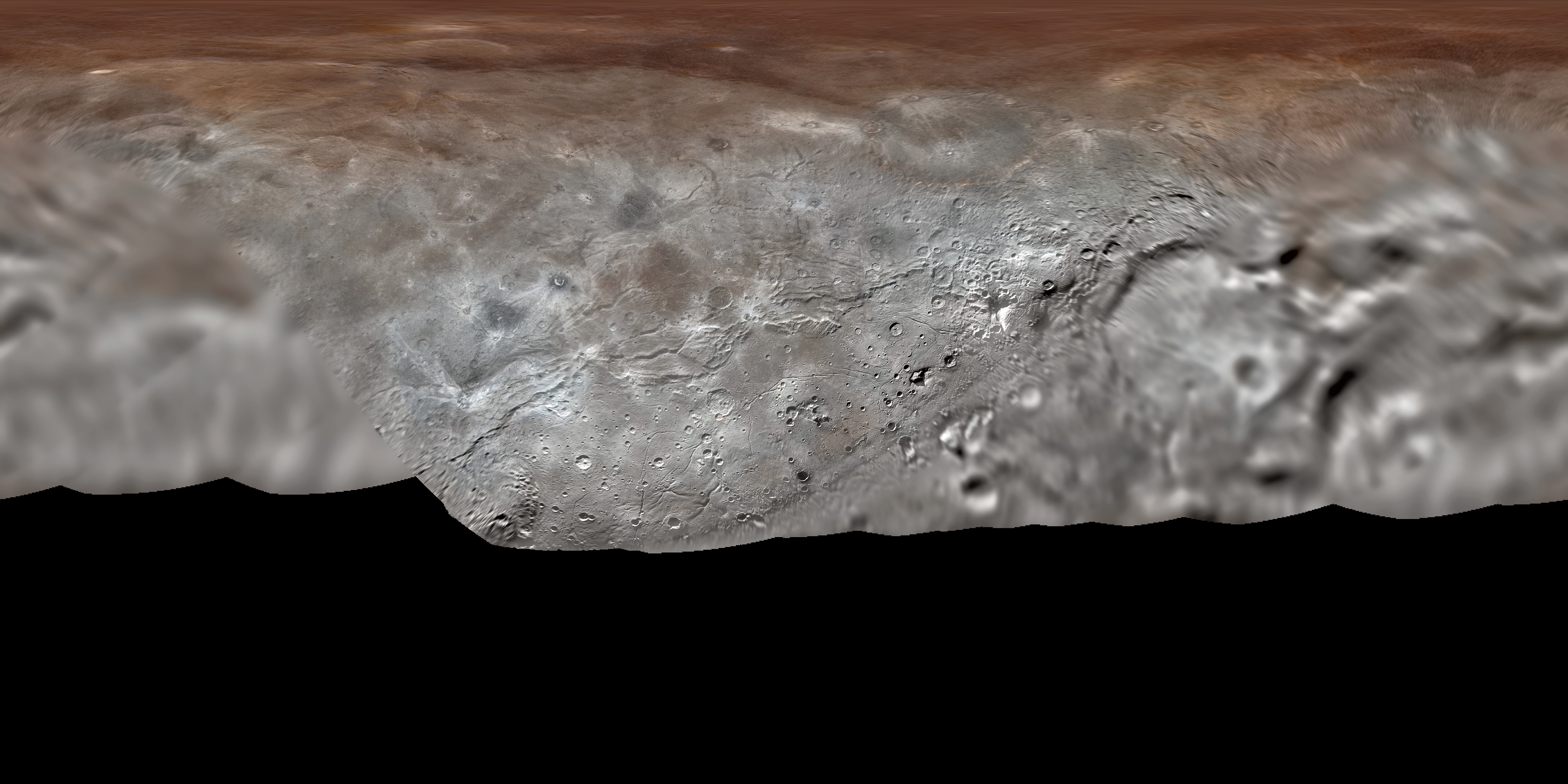
Global map of Charon, from New Horizons images

Unlike Pluto's surface, which is composed of nitrogen and methane ices, Charon's surface appears to be dominated by the less volatile water ice. In 2007, observations by the Gemini Observatory of patches of ammonia hydrates and water crystals on the surface of Charon suggested the presence of active cryogeysers. Mutual eclipses of Pluto and Charon in the 1980s allowed astronomers to take spectra of Pluto and then the combined spectrum of the pair. By subtracting Pluto's spectrum from the total, astronomers were able to spectroscopically determine the surface composition of Charon. The northern regions of Charon are composed partially of hydrocarbons and tholins, whereas the lower latitudes are more diverse in composition. Charon also appears to have little, if any, atmosphere.

Photometric mapping of Charon's surface shows a latitudinal trend in albedo, with a bright equator band and darker poles. The south polar region is apparently darker than the north. The north polar region is dominated by a very large dark area informally dubbed "Mordor" by the New Horizons team, later named Neverland Regio. The Neverland Regio is distinctly red. Aside from Neverland, however, New Horizons imaged unexpectedly few other impact craters on Charon and found a youthful surface, indicating that Charon is probably geologically active. In particular, the southern hemisphere has fewer craters than the northern and is considerably less rugged, suggesting that a massive resurfacing event—perhaps prompted by the partial or complete freezing of an internal ocean—occurred at some point in the past and removed many of the earlier craters.

Charon's surface contains several large canyons from 5 to 10 km deep. These are northeast–southwest trending. One system of troughs and cliffs extends for 1050 km. One such graben is Serenity Chasma which is 60 km wide. Others include Macross Chasma which lines up with Serenity Chasma to form a belt that extends for 1050 km. Other named chasmata are Tardis Chasma, Nostromo Chasma, and Argo Chasma which is 5 km deep.

=== Polar regions ===
Charon's north polar region, Neverland Regio, is considerably darker and more reddish than the rest of its surface. The favored explanation for this phenomenon is that it was formed by condensation of gases that escaped from Pluto's atmosphere. In winter, the temperature is −258 °C, and these gases, which include nitrogen, carbon monoxide, and methane, condense into their solid forms; when these ices are subjected to solar radiation, they chemically react to form various reddish tholins. Later, when the area is again heated by the Sun as Charon's seasons change, the temperature at the pole rises to −213 °C, resulting in the volatiles sublimating and escaping Charon, leaving only the tholins behind. Over millions of years, the residual tholin builds up thick layers, obscuring the icy crust. The south polar region is also dark, and was imaged by New Horizons using sunlight reflected off Pluto.

=== Geological mapping ===
A geomorphological map published in 2019 classifies Charon's surface into 16 types, including: blocky terrain, smooth terrain, elevated smooth terrain, rough terrain, mottled terrain, lobate aprons, and Mons, depressed material, craters and crater ejecta. Linear features were classified as catena, crater rim crest, depression margin, graben trace, groove, ridge crest, scarp base, scarp crest, or broad warp. Different time periods were labelled Ozian (older than 4 billion years, exposed in a region titled Oz Terra). The Vulcanian is next and features cryoflows, mainly near the equator in an area called Vulcan Planum. The Spokian is the period when impact craters have formed.

== Internal structure ==
Two proposed models of Charon's interior
- A possible outcome of the hot start model, with two different levels of silicate 'fines,' or micron-sized particles
- A possible outcome of the cold start model

Charon's volume and mass allow calculation of its density, 1.70±0.02 g/cm^{3}, which is slightly lower than Pluto's. Hence, Charon has a slightly lower proportion of rock in its interior relative to Pluto. This difference is not as large as those of many other collisional satellites.

Following the New Horizons flyby, numerous discovered features on Charon's surface strongly indicated that Charon is differentiated, and may even have had a subsurface ocean early in its history. The past resurfacing observed on Charon's surface indicated that Charon's ancient subsurface ocean may have fed large-scale cryoeruptions on the surface, erasing many older features. As a result, two broad competing views on the nature of Charon's interior arose: the so-called hot start model, where Charon's formation is rapid and involves a violent impact with Pluto, and the cold start model, where Charon's formation is more gradual and involves a less violent impact with Pluto.

According to the hot start model, Charon accreted rapidly (within ~10^{4} years) from the circumplanetary disc, resulting from a highly-disruptive giant impact scenario. This rapid time scale prevents the heat from accretion from radiating away during the formation process, leading to the partial melting of Charon's outer layers. However, Charon's crust failed to reach a melt fraction where complete differentiation occurs, leading to the crust retaining part of its silicate content upon freezing. A liquid subsurface ocean forms during or soon after Charon's accretion and persists for approximately 2 billion years before freezing, possibly driving cryovolcanic resurfacing of Vulcan Planitia. Radiogenic heat from Charon's core could then melt a second subsurface ocean composed of a eutectic water-ammonia mixture before it too freezes, possibly driving the formation of Kubrick Mons and other similar features. These freezing cycles could increase Charon's size by >20 km, leading to the formation of the complex tectonic features observed in Serenity Chasma and Oz Terra.

In contrast, the cold start model argues that a large subsurface ocean early in Charon's history is not necessary to explain Charon's surface features, and instead proposes that Charon may have been homogeneous and more porous at formation. According to the cold start model, as Charon's interior begins to warm due to radiogenic heating and heating from serpentinization, a phase of contraction begins, largely driven by compaction in Charon's interior. Approximately 100–200 million years after formation, enough heat builds up to where a subsurface ocean melts, leading to rapid differentiation, further contraction, and the hydration of core rocks. Despite this melting, a pristine crust of amorphous water ice on Charon remains. After this period, differentiation continues, but the core can no longer absorb more water, and thus freezing at the base of Charon's mantle begins. This freezing drives a period of expansion until Charon's core becomes warm enough to begin compaction, starting a final period of contraction. Serenity Chasma may have formed from the expansion episode, whilst the final contraction episode may have given rise to the arcuate ridges observed in Neverland Regio.
