= Vader (crater) =

Crater on Charon

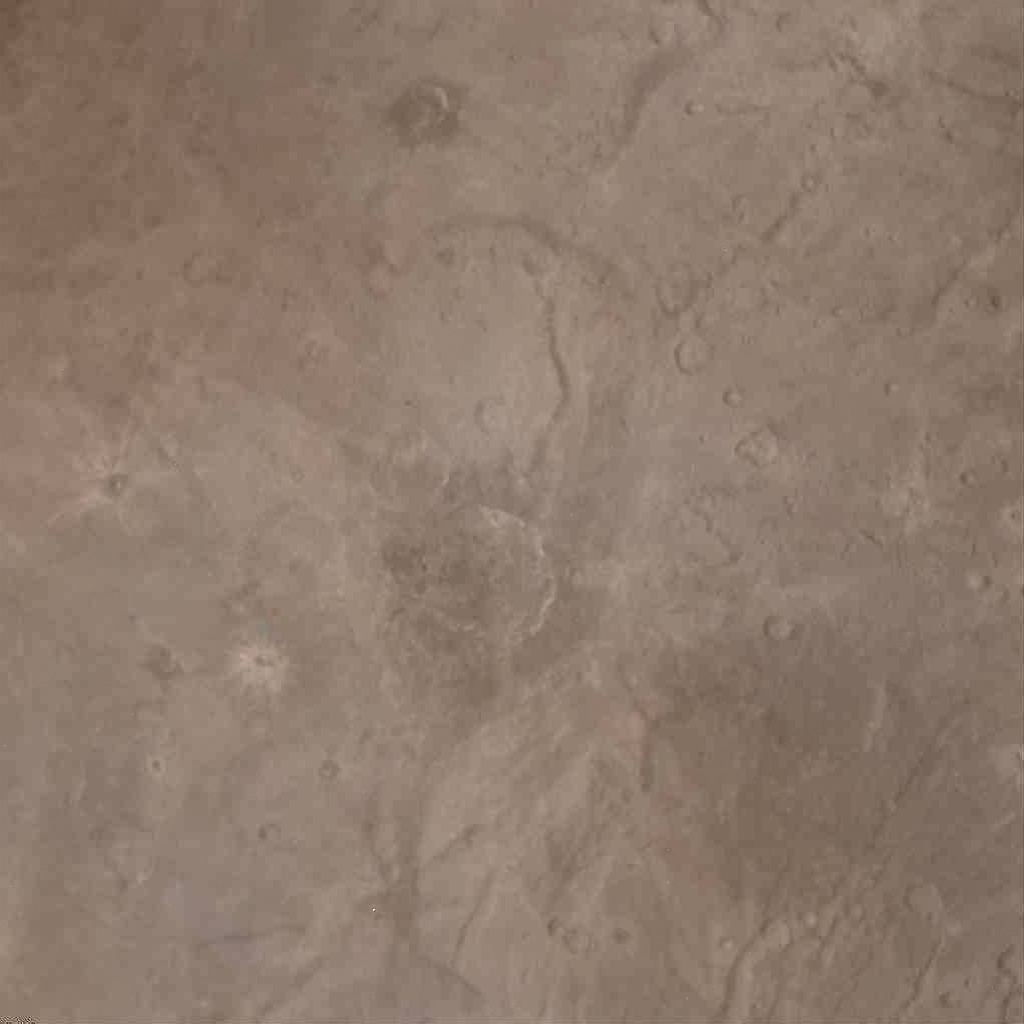
- Photo of Charon centered on Ripley Crater. Nostromo Chasma crosses Ripley vertically. Organa Crater is at 9:00, and Vader is the dark crater at 12:00
- Feature type: Impact crater
- Location: Charon
- Coordinates: 55°N 15°W
- Discoverer: New Horizons
- Naming: Unofficial
- Eponym: Darth Vader

Vader is the unofficial name given to a dark crater on Pluto's largest moon Charon. The floor of Vader is darker than the surrounding terrain, covered in the same reddish-brown dark material that covers Neverland Regio on Charon's north pole. Though Charon's surface trends darker with increasing latitude, some craters, such as Vader, interrupt this trend. The crater was discovered by NASA's New Horizons space probe on its way by Pluto. It is named after the character Darth Vader from the Star Wars media franchise; the name has yet to be officially approved by the International Astronomical Union (IAU).

== See also ==
- List of geological features on Charon
