= Nasreddin (crater) =

Crater on Charon

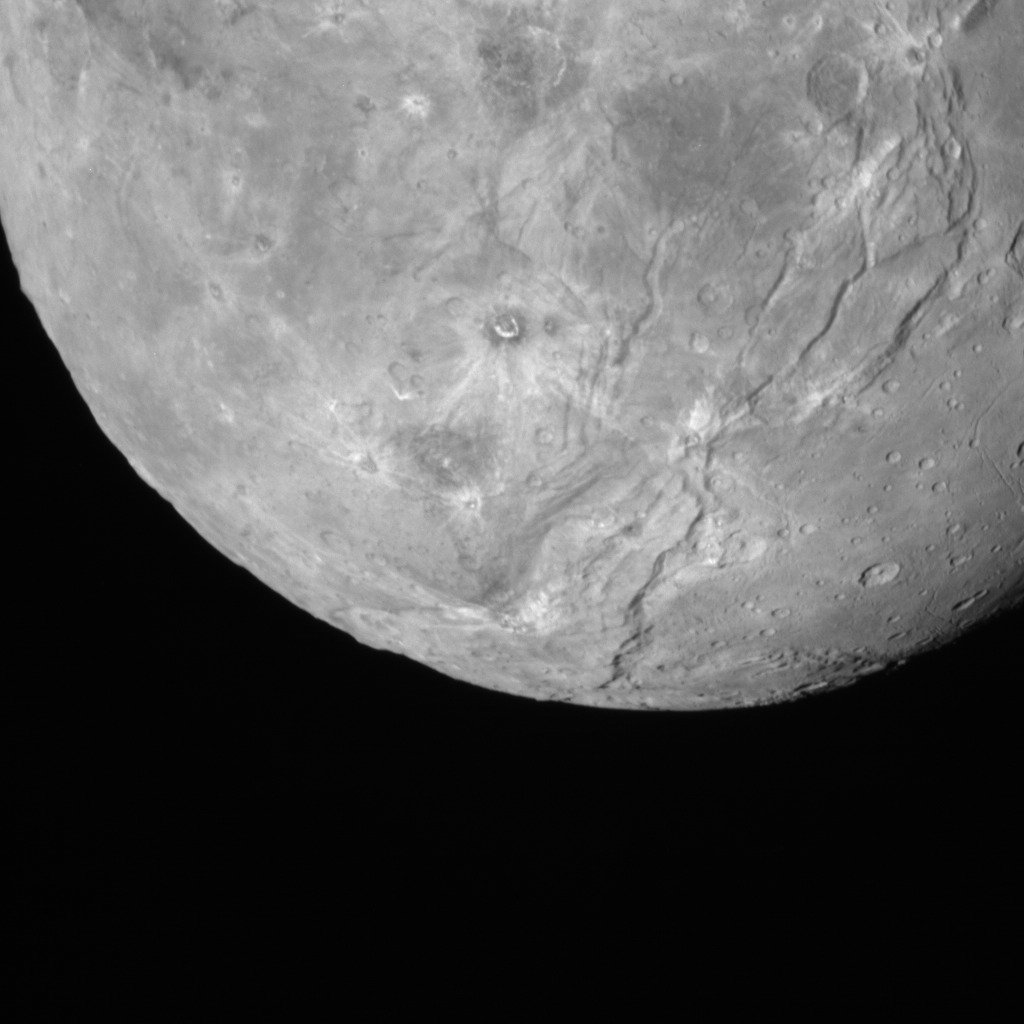
- Nasreddin crater appears in the center of this image
- Feature type: Impact crater
- Location: Oz Terra, Charon
- Coordinates: 25.5°N 51.4°W
- Diameter: 29.7 kilometres (18.5 mi)
- Discoverer: New Horizons
- Eponym: Sufi traveler from folklore

Nasreddin is a crater on Pluto's largest moon, Charon. The crater was first observed by NASA's New Horizons space probe on its flyby of Pluto in 2015. The name was chosen as a reference to Nasreddin, the hero of humorous folktales told throughout the Middle East, Southern Europe, and parts of Asia. The name was officially approved by the International Astronomical Union (IAU) on 11 April 2018.

The location of Nasreddin crater is in the northern Pluto-facing hemisphere of Charon, north of Mandjet Chasma in a region informally called Oz Terra. The crater has bright bluish rays, indicative of fresher crust material composed of water and ammonia ices.

== See also ==
- List of geological features on Charon
