= Pirx (crater) =

Crater on Charon

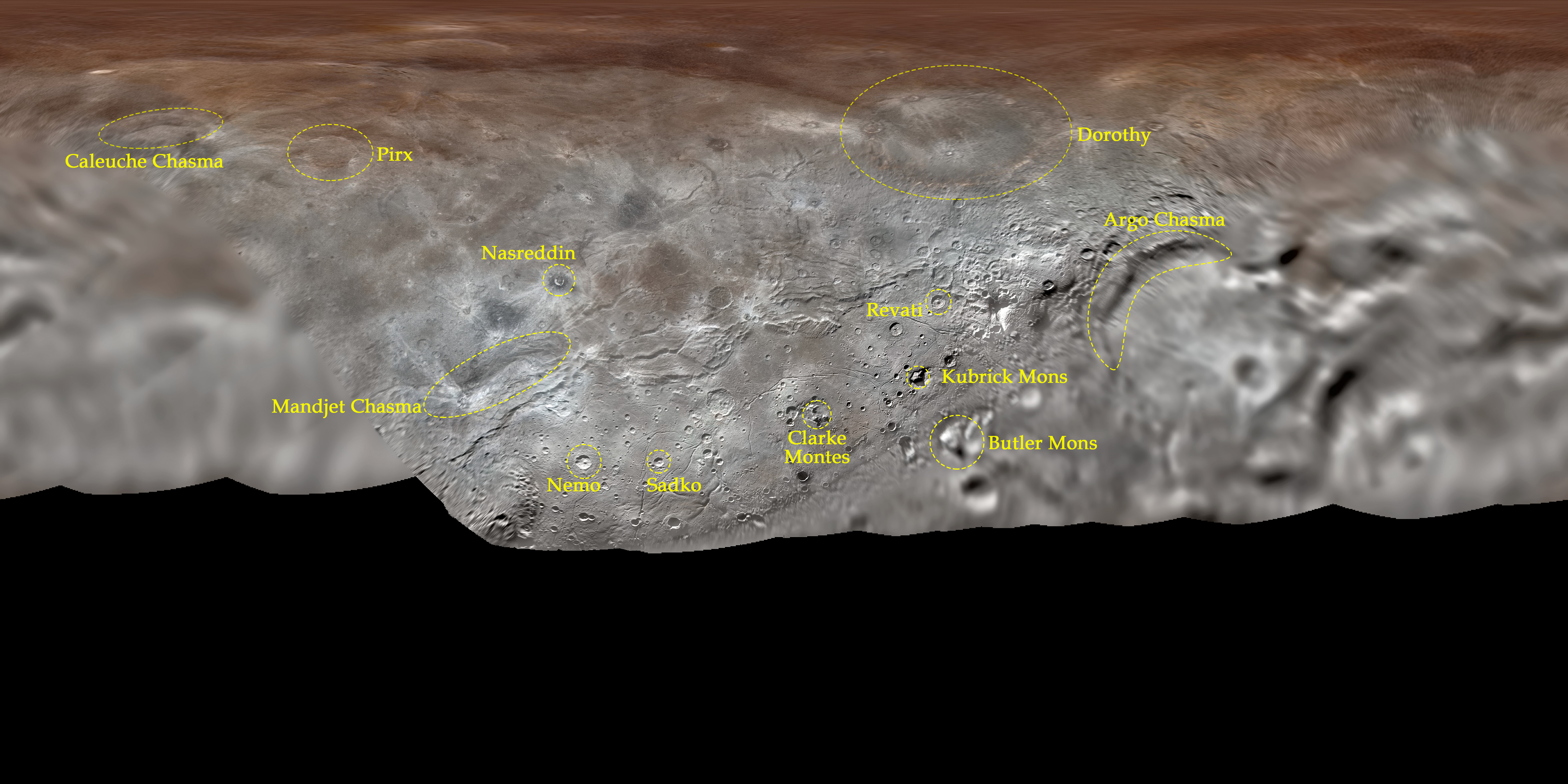
- Annotated map of Charon, with IAU-approved names for features as of 2018
- Feature type: Impact crater
- Location: Oz Terra, Charon
- Coordinates: 55.2°N 256.18°E
- Diameter: 90 km
- Discoverer: New Horizons
- Eponym: Pirx the Pilot

Pirx is a 90 km (55.9 miles) wide impact crater on Pluto's natural satellite Charon, discovered in 2015 by the New Horizons spacecraft as it performed its flyby of Pluto and its system of moons. It is located in at 55.2°N 256.18°E. The crater is located near Charon's north pole.

Pirx is named after Pilot Pirx, the main character in a series of short stories by Stanislaw Lem. The name was approved by the International Astronomical Union (IAU) on 11 April 2018.

== See also ==
- List of geological features on Charon
