= Ripley (crater) =

Crater on Charon

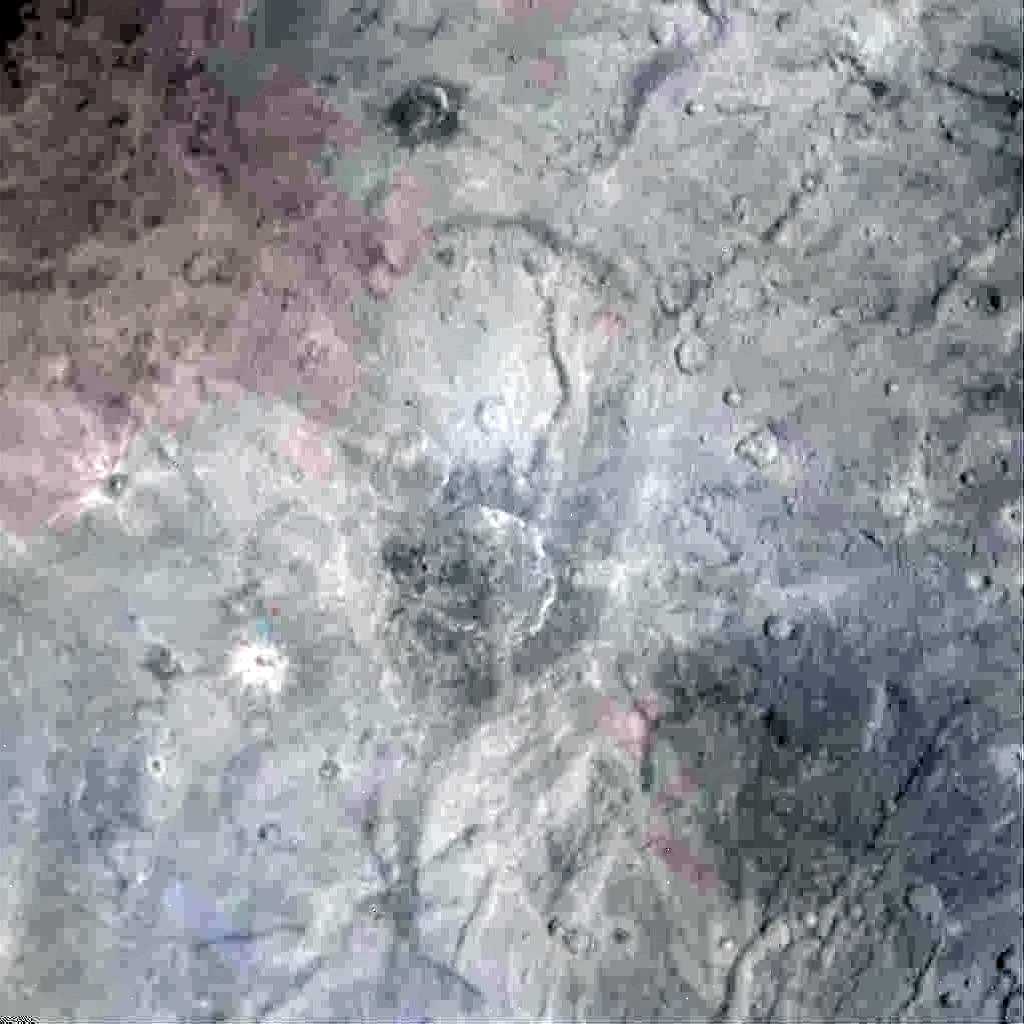
- Ripley overlies Nostromo Chasma in the center of this New Horizons photo.
- Feature type: Impact crater
- Location: Oz Terra, Charon
- Coordinates: 40°N 30°W
- Discoverer: New Horizons
- Eponym: Ellen Ripley

Ripley /ˈrɪpli/ is the unofficial name given to an impact crater on Pluto's moon Charon. It is located in Charon's northern hemisphere, within the highlands of Oz Terra. It is named after the heroine Ellen Ripley in the science-fiction/horror film Alien.

The floor and terrain surrounding Ripley are dark. Unlike Neverland Regio and Gallifrey Macula, however, the dark material within Ripley is not reddish-brown.
