= Serenity Chasma =

Major fault system on Charon

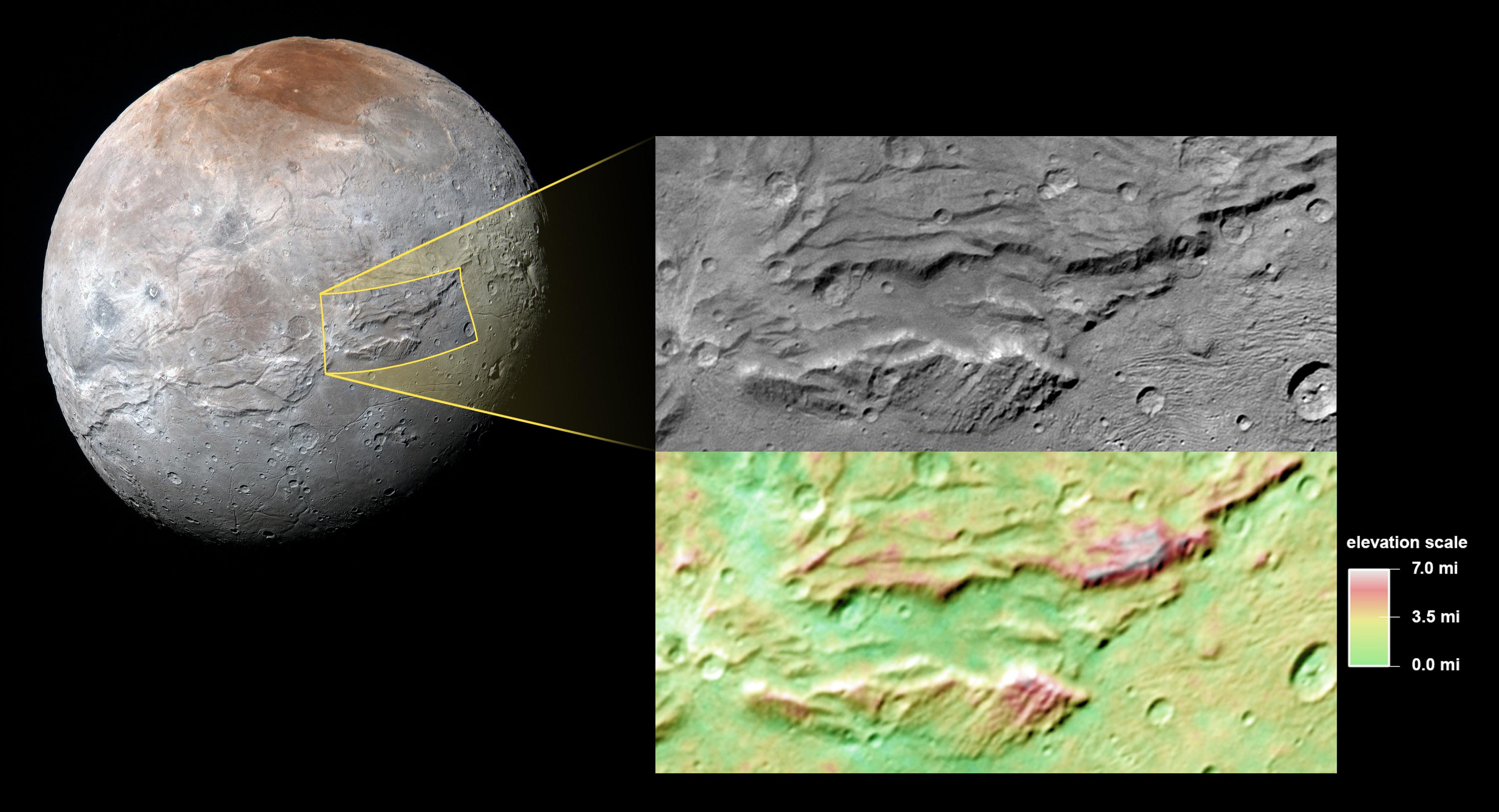
- The side of Charon viewed by the passing New Horizons spacecraft in July 2015 shows a system of “pull apart” tectonic faults, which look like ridges, scarps and valleys—the latter sometimes reaching more than 4 miles (6.5 kilometers) deep. Courtesy New Horizons mission/JHU/APL
- Feature type: Tectonic fault
- Location: Pluto-facing side of Charon
- Coordinates: 19°N 5°W
- Length: >200 km
- Width: 40–50 km
- Depth: 5–7 km
- Discoverer: New Horizons
- Eponym: Serenity, a spaceship in the Firefly series

Serenity Chasma is the unofficial name given to a large pull-apart fault on Pluto's moon, Charon. It is part of a series of faults that run along the perimeter of Vulcan Planitia. It was discovered by the New Horizons mission, and informally named after the fictitious spaceship, Serenity.

== Geology ==
Serenity Chasma is over 200 km (120 mi) long, about 5–7 km (3.1–4.3 mi) deep, and its typical width is 40–50 km (25–31 mi). The northern wall continues for an additional 200 km as a scarp after exiting the chasma. The chasma is part of a major tectonic belt, which involves a series of canyons, scarps, and troughs that traverse most of Charon's encounter hemisphere. The entire tectonic system, which also includes Mandjet Chasma, is one of the longest-known canyon systems in the Solar System. The morphology of Serenity Chasma resembles that of rift valleys, indicative of extensional tectonics.

Serenity Chasma likely formed as Charon's subsurface ocean froze, leading to the expansion of Charon's interior and the creation of extensional tectonics. The episode of extension may have occurred between 1.7 and 2.5 billion years ago. This expansion pushed the Oz Terra region higher and produced the fault belt across Charon's equatorial region.

Five major landslide sites have been identified within Serenity Chasma, all bound by the largest cliffs of the chasm. In addition to the five most prominent landslides, numerous minor landslides too small for detailed observation have also been observed, primarily within impact craters and a small ridge inside Serenity Chasma. Of the five major landslides, all appear to be long-runout landslides, with the ratios between the landslide runout length (L) and drop height (H) between 3.2 and 6.8; terrestrial landslide typically have L/H ratios of ~2. The runout length of the five landslides varies between 15.7 and 24.6 km, with depositional thickness at the landslide toes in the hundreds of meters. The landslides provide insight into the properties of Charon's surface material; the frictional coefficient of the landslide material is rather low, ranging from 0.15 to 0.31, comparable to terrestrial debris flows, rock avalanches, and pyroclastic flows.

== See also ==
- List of geological features on Charon
