= Eric Grosfils =

American geologist

Eric B. Grosfils is an American physical volcanologist and planetary geologist. He is the Minnie B. Cairns Memorial Professor of Geology at Pomona College in Claremont, California.

== Personal life ==
Grosfils is married to Linda A. Reinen, a structural geologist who is also on the Pomona faculty.
