= Kirk (crater) =

Crater on Charon

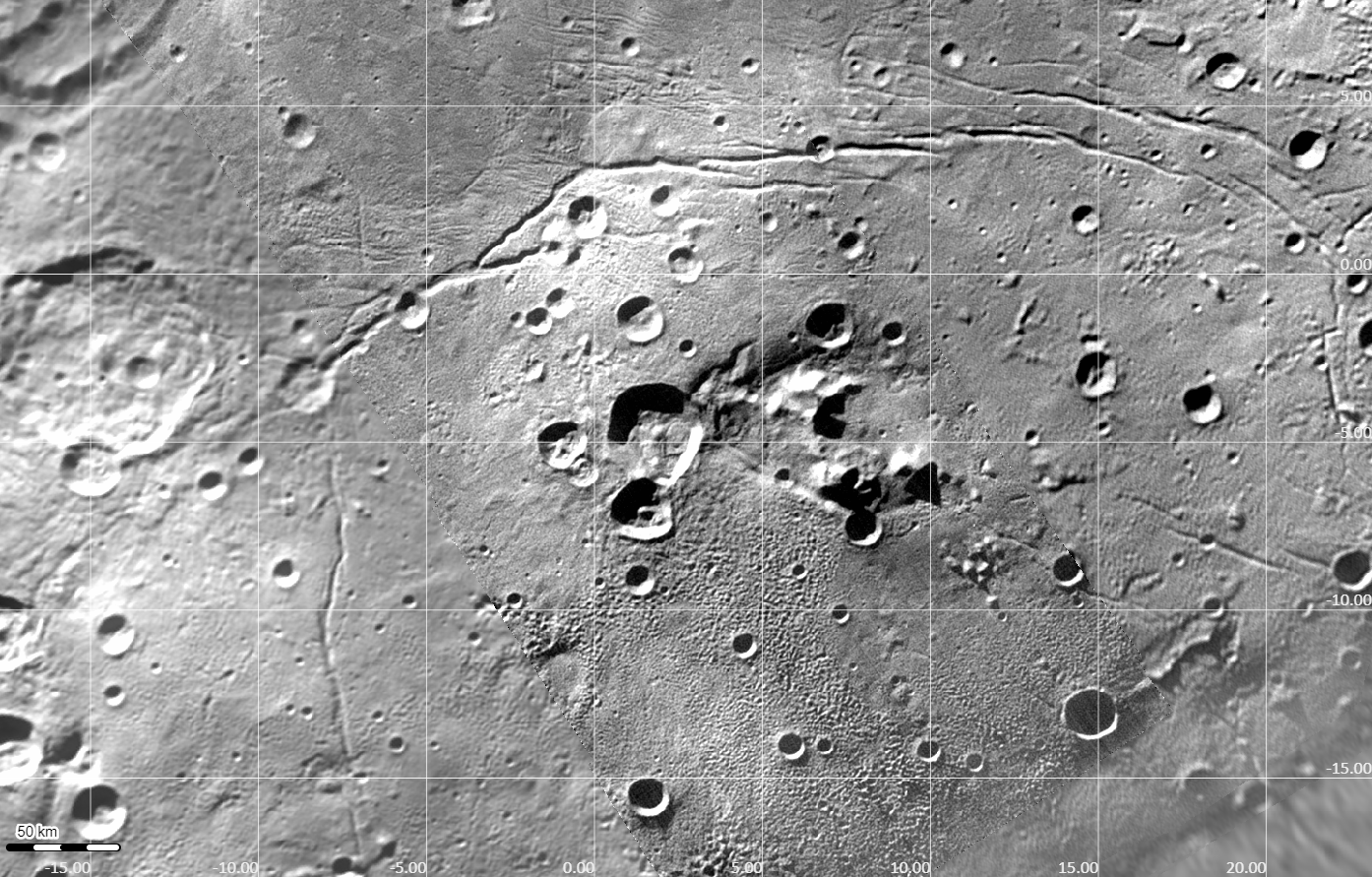
- Kirk crater is in the center of this image. To its right is Clarke Montes.
- Feature type: Impact crater
- Location: Charon
- Coordinates: 5°S 2°E
- Diameter: 30 km
- Discoverer: New Horizons
- Eponym: James T. Kirk

Kirk is the unofficial name given to a small crater on Pluto's largest moon Charon. The crater was discovered by the New Horizons space probe in 2015 during its flyby of Pluto and its moons. It was named after the character James T. Kirk from the media franchise Star Trek. The crater is located in the southern hemisphere, just south of the equator, and just east of the prime meridian, near Clarke Montes, in a region that astronomers have named Vulcan Planitia.

The floor of Kirk Crater is covered with small mounds or hummocks, which may be due to cryovolcanic activity erupting viscous material. Alternatively, the mounds may have originated from landslides.

== See also ==
- List of geological features on Charon
