= Butler Mons =

Mountain located on Charon

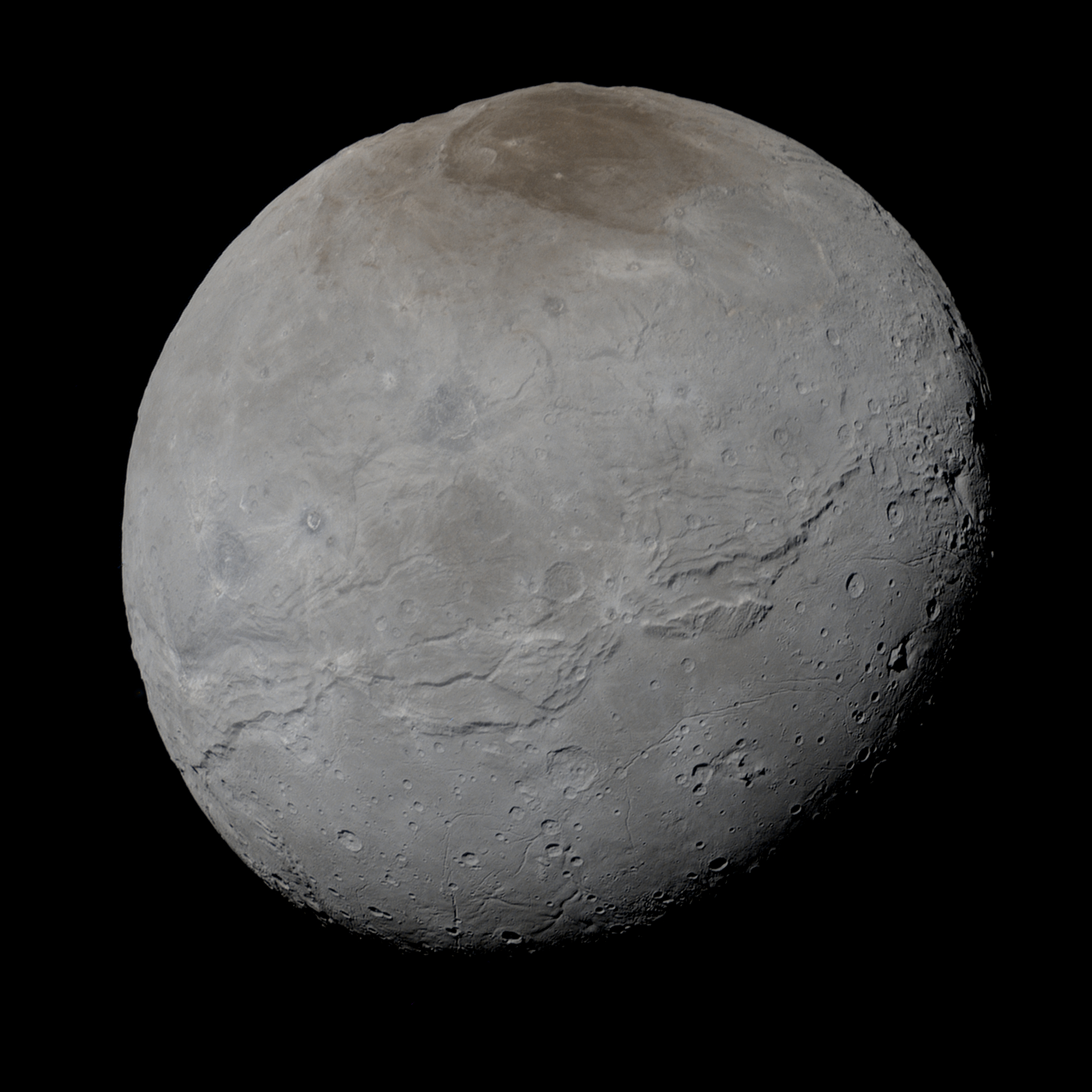
Charon

Butler Mons is a mountain located on Pluto's moon Charon, on the side that faces Pluto.

== Description ==
Butler Mons is a solitary massif with an estimated peak of 4.5 kilometres (4,500 m) and length of 91 kilometres (57 mi).

The largest observed mountain on Charon, it rises out of a geological moat in the smooth plain known as Vulcan Planitia. It shares orographical similarities with Kubrick Mons, located on the same plain.

== Discovery ==
On July 14, 2015, as part of its New Frontiers program, NASA conducted a flyby of Charon using the space probe New Horizons. Butler Mons was one of several unexpected features observed on Charon's surface, alongside canyons and landslides.

== Name ==
In partnership with NASA and the International Astronomical Union, the SETI Institute ran a campaign in 2017 encouraging members of the public to submit names for surface features on Pluto and its moons. For Charon, entrants were asked to submit names that matched the theme of authors and artists "associated with space exploration". Butler Mons was subsequently named for the American science fiction author Octavia E. Butler.
