= Caleuche (disambiguation) =

Caleuche is a legendary ghost ship from Chilote mythology.

Caleuche may also refer to:

- Caleuche (planet) or HD 164604 b, a superjovian exoplanet
- Caleuche Awards, acting awards ceremony in Chile
- Caleuche Chasma, geological feature on Pluto's moon Charon
