= Caleuche Chasma =

Major chasm on Charon

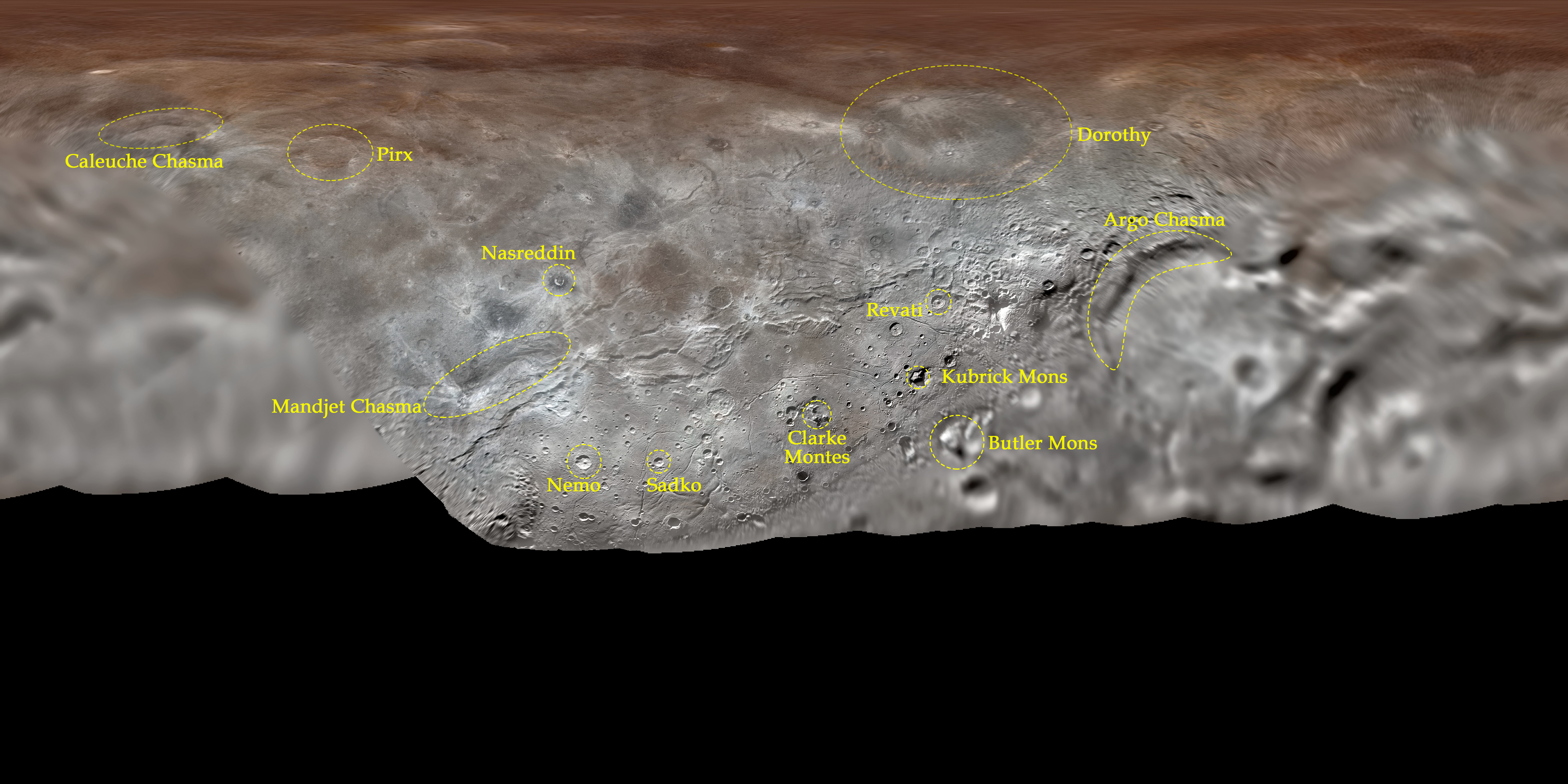
- Caleuche Chasma can be seen close to the top-left corner of this map
- Feature type: Chasma
- Location: Charon's northern hemisphere
- Coordinates: 72.5°N 241.8°E
- Length: 400 km
- Depth: ~13 km
- Discoverer: New Horizons
- Eponym: Caleuche, a Chilean legendary ghost ship

Caleuche Chasma is a Y-shaped chasma on Pluto's moon, Charon. Caleuche Chasma is 400 km (250 mi) long. The feature was discovered using stereoscopic processing of New Horizons images. At approximately 13 km (8.1 mi) deep, it is the deepest known feature on the natural satellite, and one of the deepest known canyons in the Solar System.

== Naming ==
Caleuche Chasma got its official name from the International Astronomical Union (IAU) along with eleven other surface features of Charon on 11 April 2018 in response to a proposal by NASA's New Horizons team. It is named for El Caleuche, the mythical Chilean ghost ship. The designation was a part of the Our Pluto initiative by New Horizons, which invited the general public to suggest and vote for names for surface features in the Pluto system. Caleuche was included in the voting on 21 March 2015. It did not make to the initial proposal, sent to the IAU by the New Horizons team on 7 July 2015 but was included later.

== Geology ==
Caleuche Chasma is the deepest known feature on Charon, with a maximum depth of approximately 13 kilometers—over 2% of Charon's mean radius of 606 kilometers. Caleuche Chasma is roughly a Y-shaped depression, bordering Neverland Regio and located in the highly tectonized highlands of Oz Terra. Partially separating Caleuche Chasma from Neverland Regio is a large curvilinear ridge; this ridge appears to act as a barrier against the dark material found in the "core" regions of Neverland Regio, as the floor of Caleuche Chasma does not appear to be as dark.

== See also ==
- List of geological features on Charon
