= Planetary geology =

Geological study of planets

Planetary geology, alternatively known as astrogeology or exogeology, is a planetary science discipline concerned with the geology of celestial bodies such as planets and their moons, asteroids, comets, and meteorites. Although the geo- prefix typically indicates topics of or relating to Earth, planetary geology is named as such for historical and convenience reasons; due to the subject matter, it is closely linked with more traditional Earth-based geology.

Planetary geology includes such topics as determining the properties and processes of the internal structure of the terrestrial planets, surface processes such as volcanism, impact craters, even fluvial and aeolian action where applicable. Despite their outermost layers being dominated by gases, the giant planets are also included in the field of planetary geology, especially when it comes to their interiors. Fields within Planetary geology are largely derived from fields in the traditional geological sciences, such as geophysics, geomorphology, and geochemistry.

== History ==
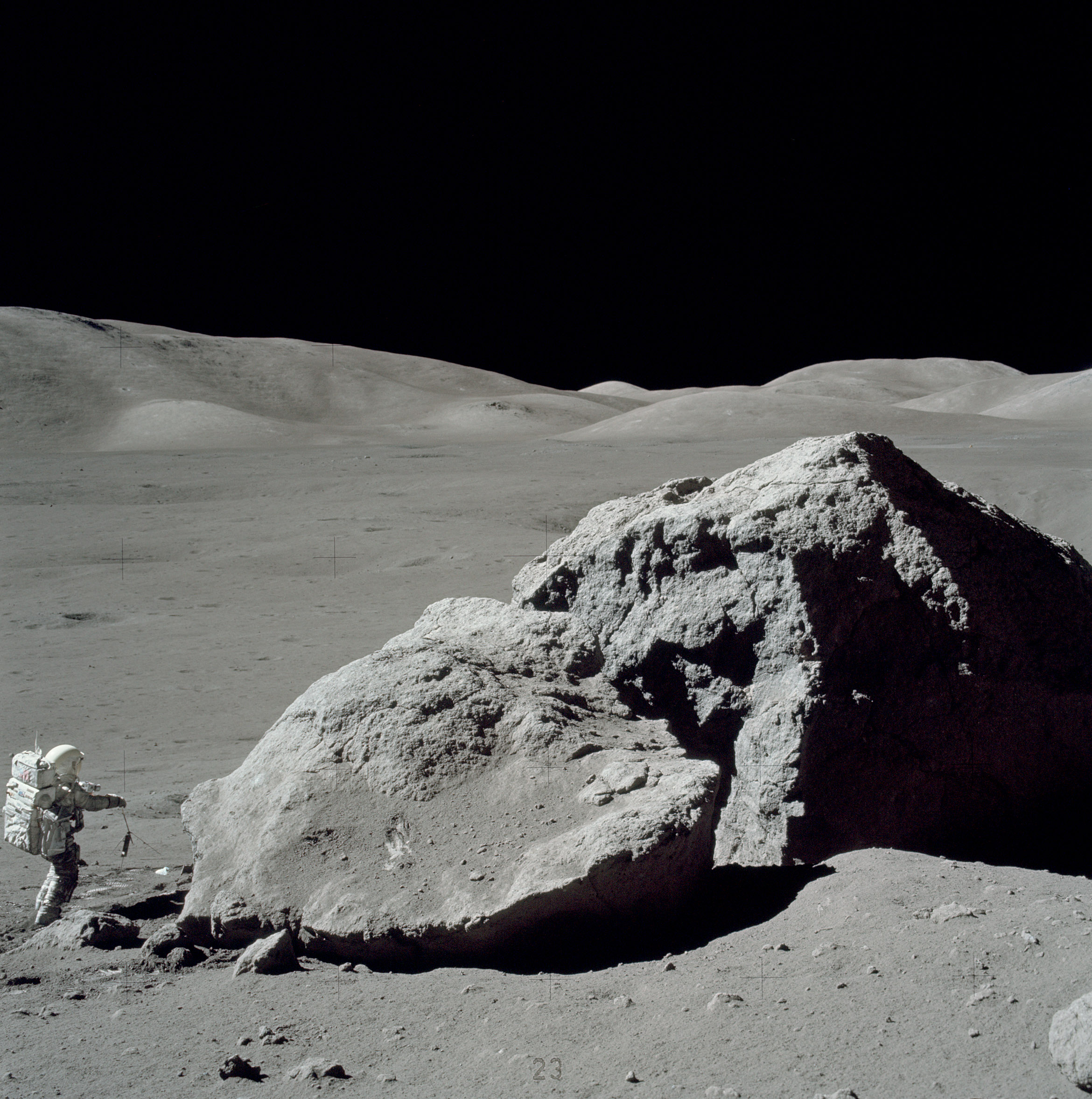
Planetary geologist and NASA astronaut Harrison "Jack" Schmitt collecting lunar samples during the Apollo 17 mission in early-December 1972

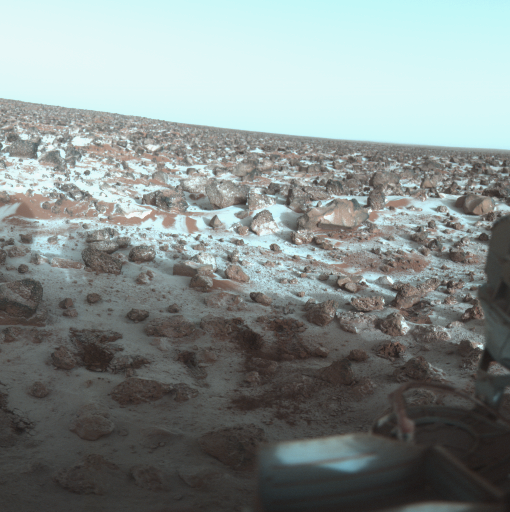
Surface of Mars in a false-color photograph by the Viking 2 lander, December 9, 1977

Eugene Merle Shoemaker is credited with bringing geologic principles to planetary mapping and creating the branch of planetary science in the early 1960s, the Astrogeology Research Program, within the United States Geological Survey. He made important contributions to the field and the study of impact craters, selenography (study of the Moon), asteroids, and comets.

== Research and education ==
Major centers for planetary science research include the Lunar and Planetary Institute, Applied Physics Laboratory, Planetary Science Institute, Jet Propulsion Laboratory, Southwest Research Institute, and Johnson Space Center. Outside the United States, the main institutes for geology research are JAXA’s Institute of Space and Astronautical Science (ISAS) in Japan, the Max Planck Institute for Solar System Research and German Aerospace Center both in Germany, the China National Space Administration in China and the Centre National d’Études Spatiales (CNES) in France.
Additionally, several universities conduct extensive planetary science research, including Montana State University, Brown University, the University of Arizona, California Institute of Technology, University of Colorado, Western Michigan University, Massachusetts Institute of Technology, Washington University in St. Louis, University of Western Ontario in Canada, and University of Cambridge in the UK.
Planetary geologists usually study either geology, astronomy, planetary science, geophysics, or one of the earth sciences at the graduate level.

== Tools ==
Simulated interplanetary missions performed on Earth have studied procedures and tools for planetary geology. Various tools, including common archaeological tools such as hammers, shovels, brushes, were evaluated for use by planetary geologists. Along with these common tools, new advanced technologies have become available. These include spectroscopic databases, and data (such as mission logs, images and mapping) from previous unmanned interplanetary missions. Scientists use maps, images, telescopes on Earth, and orbiting telescopes (such as the Hubble Space Telescope). The maps and images are stored in the NASA Planetary Data System where tools such as the Planetary Image Atlas help to search for certain items such as geological features including mountains, ravines, and craters.

== Features and terms ==
Planetary geology uses a wide variety of standardized terms for features. All planetary feature names recognized by the International Astronomical Union (IAU) combine one of these terms with a possibly unique identifying name. The conventions which decide the more precise name are dependent on which planetary body the feature is on, but there are standard descriptors common to all astronomical planetary bodies. New terms must be recognized by the IAU Working Group for Planetary System Nomenclature, and are commonly added as features are mapped and described by new planetary missions. This means that in some cases, names may change as improved imagery becomes available, or in other cases widely adopted informal names are changed to be in line with the rules. The standard names are chosen to consciously avoid interpreting the underlying cause of the feature, but rather to describe only its appearance.

== By planetary body ==
- Geological features of the Solar System
- Geological history of Earth
- Geology of Mercury
- Geology of Venus
- Geology of the Moon
- Geology of Mars
- Geology of Vesta
- Geology of Ceres
- Geology of Io
- Geology of Titan
- Geology of Triton
- Geology of Pluto
- Geology of Charon

== See also ==
- Astrobiology – Science concerned with life in the universe
- Exoplanet – Planet outside of the Solar System
- Exoplanetology
- Planetary habitability – Known extent to which a planet is suitable for life
- LHS 3844 b – Exoplanet in the constellation Indus
