= Nostromo Chasma =

Surface feature on the Plutonian moon Charon

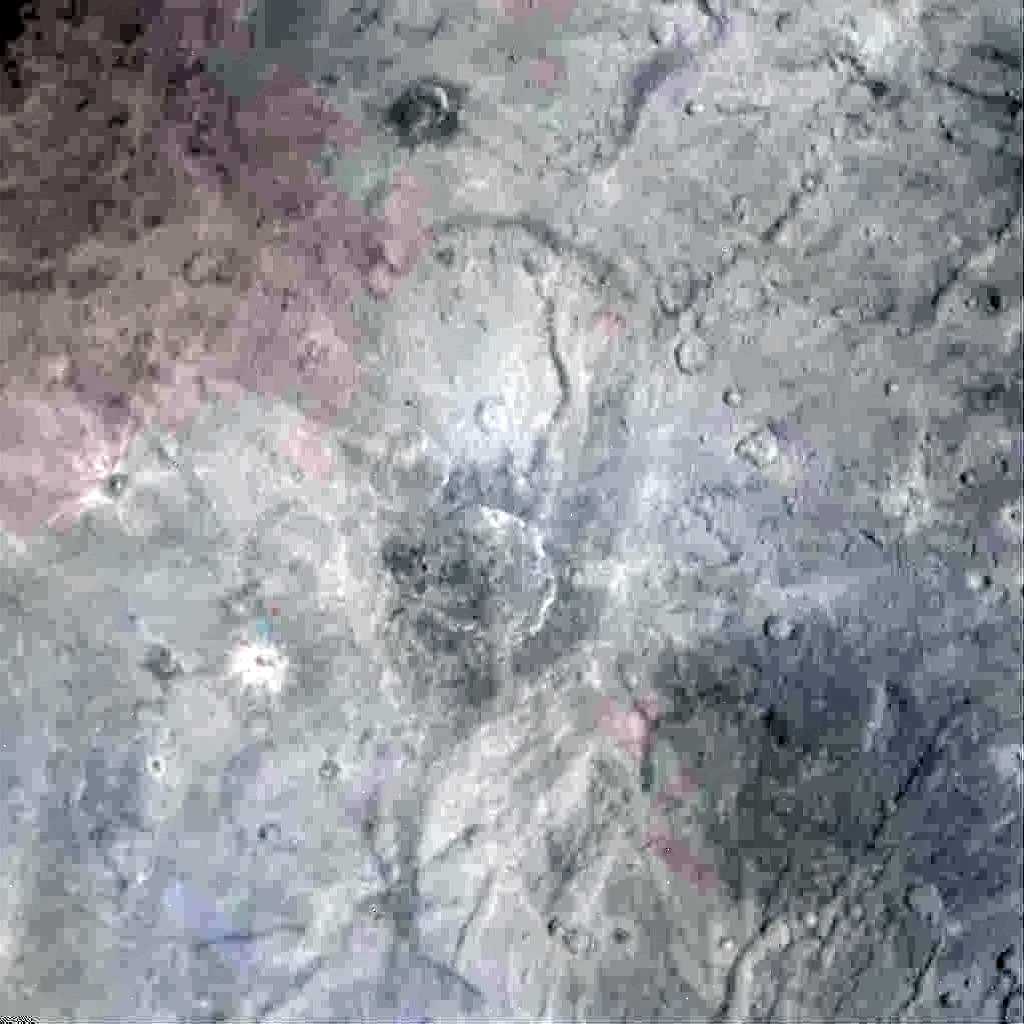
- Nostromo Chasma cuts vertically across the terrain in this New Horizons photo, with Ripley Crater in the center.
- Feature type: Chasma
- Location: Between Oz Terra and Vulcan Planitia
- Discoverer: New Horizons
- Naming: Informal
- Eponym: Spaceship in the Alien films

Nostromo Chasma /nɒsˈtroʊmoʊ ˈkæzmə/ is the unofficial name for a rift valley on Pluto's moon Charon. It was named after the fictional spacecraft in the science-fiction/horror film Alien, which in turn was named after the novel by Joseph Conrad.
