= Gallifrey Macula =

Dark region on the Plutonian moon Charon

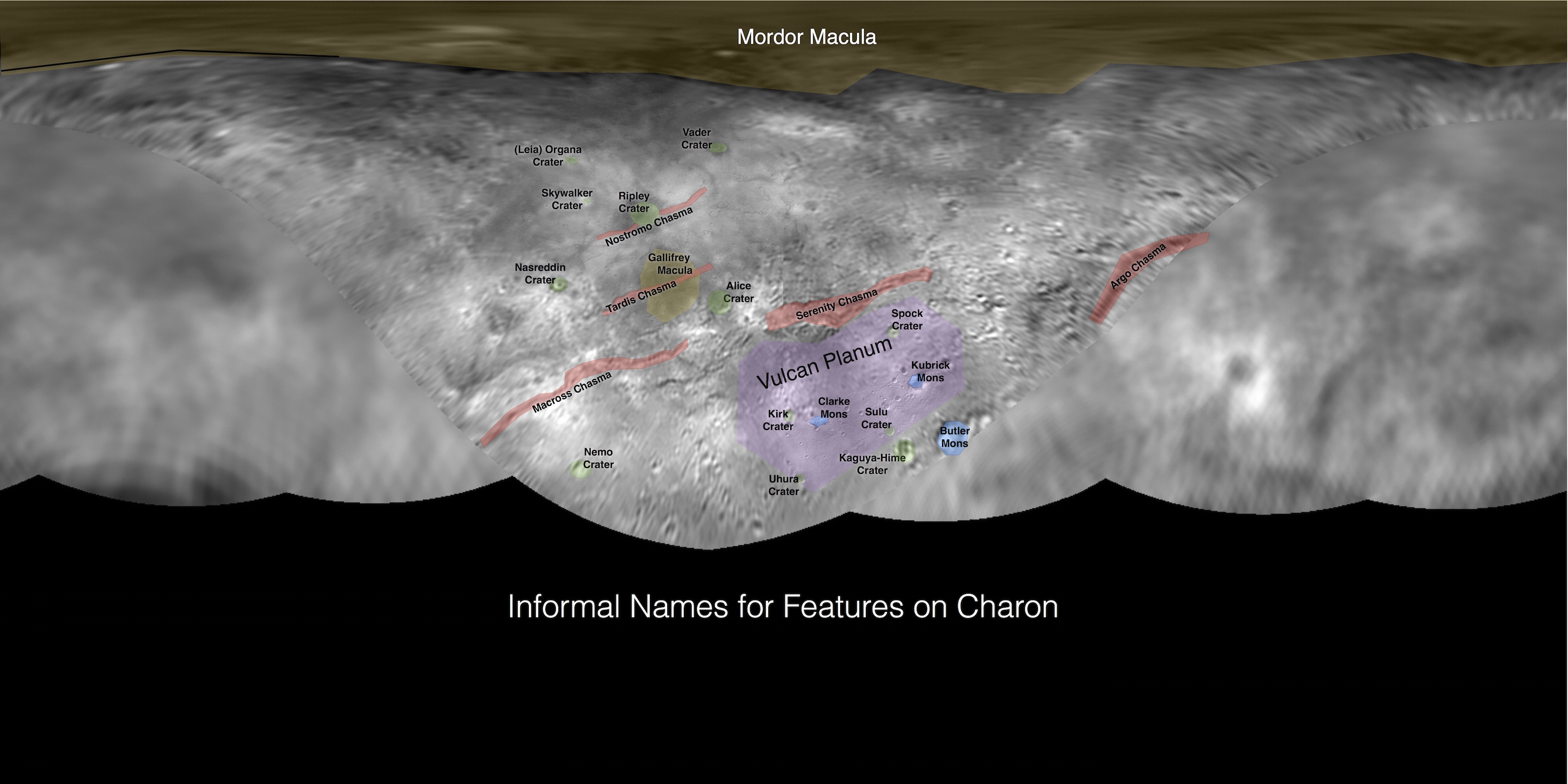
- An annotated map of Charon, with Gallifrey Macula to the north west of Vulcan Planitia
- Feature type: Macula
- Location: Charon
- Coordinates: 25°N 25°W
- Discoverer: New Horizons

Gallifrey Macula /ˈɡælɪfreɪ/ is a dark surface feature on Pluto's moon Charon. It is named after the fictional planet Gallifrey in the television series Doctor Who. As a further homage to Doctor Who, Gallifrey Macula is bisected by Tardis Chasma.
