= Kubrick Mons =

Moated mountain on Charon

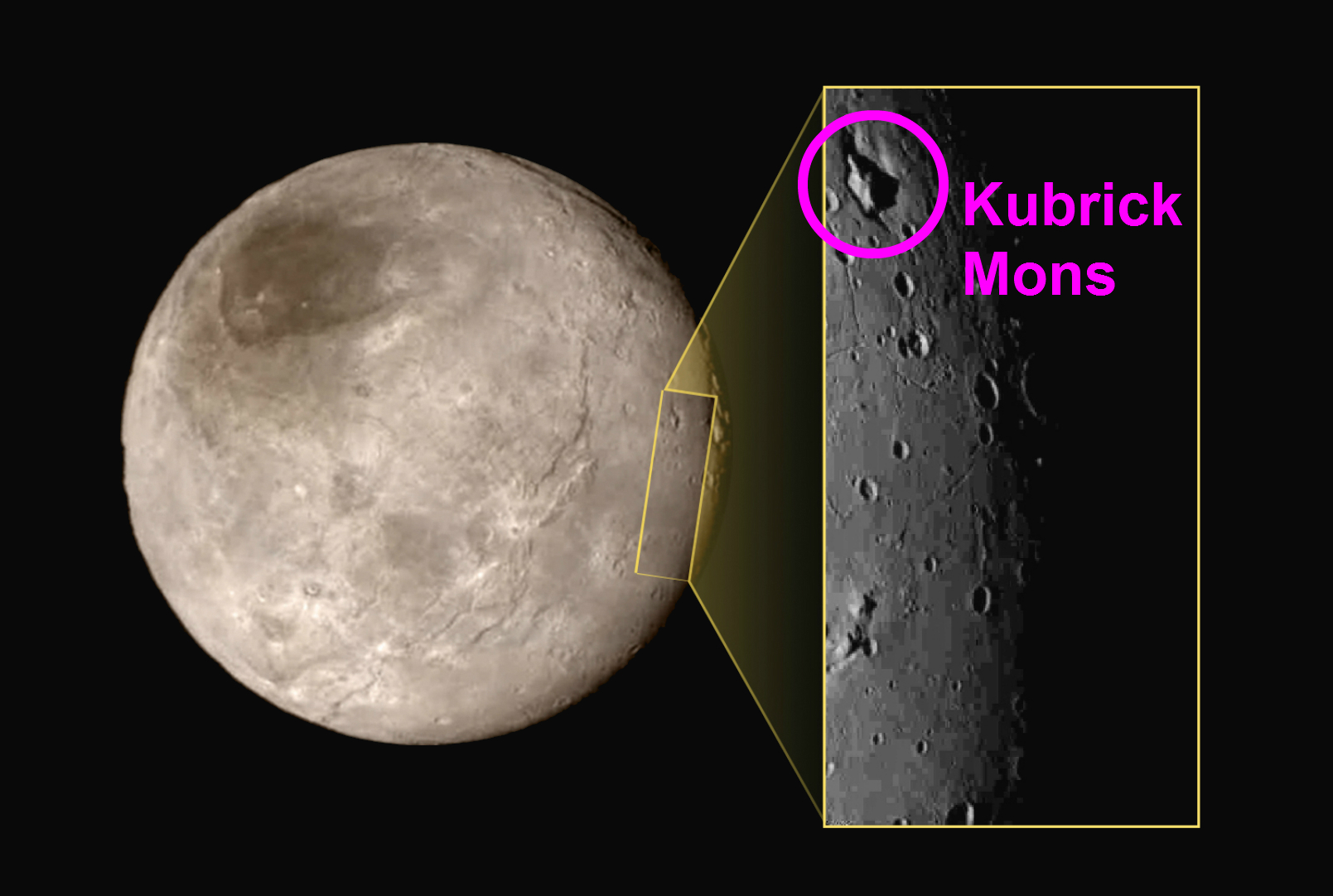
- Kubrick Mons is a depression with a peak in the middle, shown here in the upper left corner of the inset.
- Feature type: Moated mountain
- Location: Vulcan Planitia, Charon
- Coordinates: 3.6°N 30.8°E
- Diameter: 40 kilometres (25 mi)
- Peak: 3–4 km (1.9–2.5 mi)
- Discoverer: New Horizons
- Eponym: Stanley Kubrick

Kubrick Mons is the name given to the largest of a series of mountain peaks on Pluto's moon Charon that rise out of depressions in the Vulcan Planitia region. The feature was first recorded by the Long Range Reconnaissance Imager (LORRI) aboard the New Horizons spacecraft during a flyby on 15 July 2015.

== Physical description ==
Kubrick Mons has a diameter of 40 kilometres (25 mi) and is 3–4 kilometres (1.9–2.5 mi) in height. The feature is surrounded by a moat which has a depth of 1–2 kilometres (0.62–1.24 mi) below the surrounding area. It is not currently known how Kubrick Mons formed; however, there is speculation that Kubrick Mons may be a cryovolcano and the depression may be the result of a shrinking chamber of water and ammonia. As of November 2019 this hypothesis remains unconfirmed.

The mountain was named after film director Stanley Kubrick. Official approval of the name was announced by the International Astronomical Union on 11 April 2018. It is sometimes called Charon's Mountain in a Moat or more simply Moat Mountain.
