= Neverland Regio =

North polar dark region on Charon

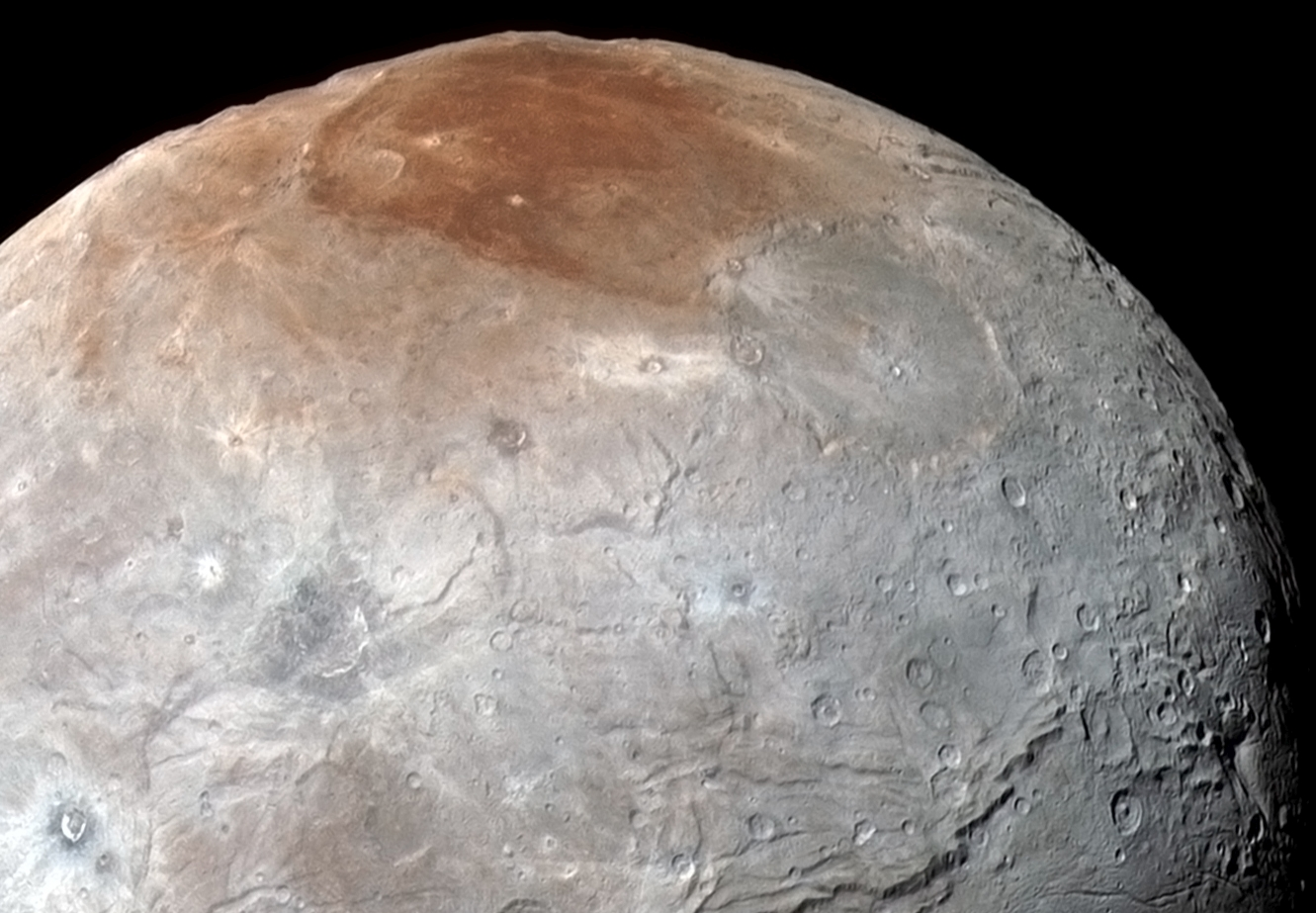
- An enhanced-color image of Neverland Regio on Charon's north pole. The ridge McCaffrey Dorsum curves around the upper center, whilst the crater Dorothy is located at the upper right.
- Feature type: Dark region
- Location: North pole of Charon
- Diameter: c. 375 km (233 mi)
- Discoverer: New Horizons
- Naming: Official
- Eponym: Neverland

Neverland Regio (formerly nicknamed Mordor Macula (/ˈmɔːrdɔːr ˈmækjʊlə/)) is a large dark area about 375 km (233 mi) in diameter near the north pole of Charon, Pluto's largest moon. It is named after Peter Pan's Neverland (the initial nickname was that of the black land called Mordor in J. R. R. Tolkien's The Lord of the Rings).

== Geography ==
Neverland Regio is located at Charon's north pole. Its dark "core" is roughly 375 kilometers in diameter, though a surrounding lighter halo extends further into the highlands of Oz Terra, beginning to appear north of 45°N and trending darker with increasing latitude.

The boundary of the regio, though ill-defined, is roughly circular with two major disruptions. One, named McCaffrey Dorsum, is a curvilinear ridge 1–2 kilometers high and stretching between ~150° and ~0°W between 72° and 77°N. McCaffrey Dorsum appears to act as a barrier to the spread or distribution of dark material. The pole-facing slopes of the ridge contain some of the darkest terrain observed on Charon, whilst the equator-facing slopes show little deposition of the dark material. The second disruption is Dorothy, the largest-known impact basin on Charon. The floor of Dorothy is significantly lighter, appearing to carve an arc into the dark core of Neverland Regio. An unnamed ~80 km wide impact crater within the regio also has a bright floor. Broadly, the distribution of Neverland Regio's dark material seems only loosely influenced by local topography.

== Geology ==
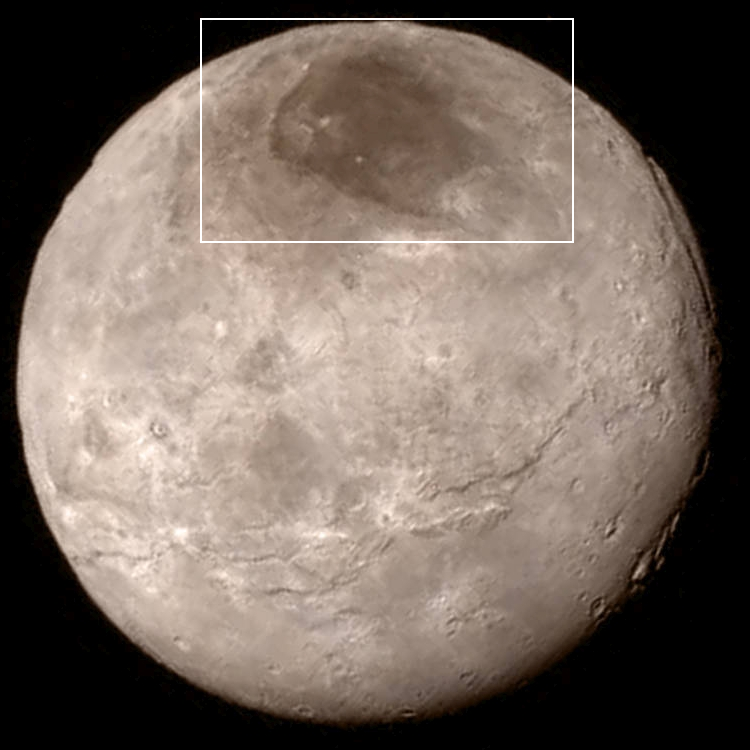
Neverland Regio is located at Charon's north pole.

The terrain Neverland Regio occupies appears to be rather dramatic, with numerous scarps and irregular depressions. In the direction of the 90°E meridian, it’s roughly at the same altitude as Oz Terra. In the direction of the 90°W meridian by contrast, its terrain gently slopes downwards to ~2 km below Charon's mean elevation before encountering the McCaffrey Dorsum. Beyond the ridge is a massive deep canyon, Caleuche Chasma. Due to Charon's current geological inactivity, Neverland Regio has been relatively unchanged since its formation.

The dark material is reddish-brown in color and has been likened to the dark equatorial belt of Pluto. Pluto's dark equatorial terrain is covered in deposits of tholins, a generic term for a tar-like mixture of radiation-processed organic compounds. As such, the dark reddish-brown coloration of Neverland Regio is likely caused by tholins as well. However, spectral observations of Charon's north pole is still dominated by signatures of water ice, so the dark deposits must be thin and relatively sparse. This is supported by the inconsistent correlation between the distribution of dark material and local topography, indicating that the material is not a thick and discrete deposit.

=== Origin ===
The origin of Neverland Regio is not completely understood. It may be a deposit of frozen gases captured from Pluto's escaping atmosphere. A leading hypothesis is that nitrogen and methane escape from Pluto's atmosphere and are then deposited into the cold poles of Charon, where scattered ultraviolet light then transforms the molecules into tholins, a generic term for a tar-like organic slurry. Despite the fact that during Pluto winter the Northern hemisphere goes without sunlight for more than 100 years, enough radiation makes it to Charon's surface to form the red tholins. The extreme orbital eccentricity and axial tilt of Pluto and Charon's orbits drive a large sublimation event during Plutonian spring, where methane and other gases from Pluto's surface may escape the planet's gravity and condense onto Charon's surface, an effect called "cold trapping". This hypothesis implies that a similar red spot should exist on Charon's south pole as well—and indirect evidence suggests this is true.

It is also possible that Neverland Regio has a cryovolcanic origin. Observations of other Kuiper belt objects (KBOs) show similar features as Neverland Regio, making the atmospheric transfer model less likely. A second hypothesis of its origin states that cryovolcanism in Vulcan Planitia pumped enough methane into the paleoatmosphere from Charon's subsurface to create the regio. Methane is first released into the atmosphere via cryovolcanism, where most of the gas migrates to Charon's north and south poles, freezing and becoming trapped there as ice. Some of the gas will reach Charon's escape velocity and be lost to space. After a long period of time, solar radiation irradiated the trapped methane ice and produced tholins, creating the dark deposits observed today.

== See also ==
- List of geological features on Charon
- Macula (planetary geology)
