= Mandjet Chasma =

Surface feature on the Plutonian moon Charon

- Mandjet Chasma appears on the left side of this image
- Feature type: Tectonic system
- Location: Pluto-facing side of Charon
- Coordinates: 4.8°N 294.4°E
- Length: 385 km
- Width: 30 km
- Depth: 5–7 km
- Discoverer: New Horizons
- Eponym: The boat of Ra, in Egyptian mythology

Mandjet Chasma is a chasma on Pluto's moon Charon. Mandjet Chasma is 385 km (239 mi) long, and about 5–7 km (3.1–4.3 mi) deep with an average width of 30 km (19 mi). The chasma is part of a global tectonic belt: a series of canyons, scarps, and troughs that traverse the face of Charon along the northern edge of Vulcan Planitia. The feature was discovered using stereoscopic processing of New Horizons images.

== See also ==
- List of geological features on Charon
