= Oz Terra =

Major region on Charon

- An annotated map of Charon, with Oz Terra in the northern hemisphere.
- Feature type: Region
- Location: Charon
- Discoverer: New Horizons
- Naming: Unofficial
- Eponym: Land of Oz

Oz Terra is the unofficial name given to a major geological region on Charon. The Pluto-facing hemisphere of Charon is divided onto two primary regions; Oz Terra in the north and Vulcan Planitia in the south. These regions are separated by a series of scarps near Charon's equator, particularly Serenity Chasma and Mandjet Chasma. The region was discovered by New Horizons during its flyby of Pluto in July 2015.

The name is derived from the Land of Oz, the fantasy land created by L. Frank Baum for his 1900 children's novel The Wonderful Wizard of Oz. The name was also favored for the entire moon by its discoverer, James W. Christy.

== Geology ==
Oz Terra sits about a kilometer higher than Vulcan Planitia, and is typified by large crustal blocks, having fractured early in Charon's history. The region was formed about 4 billion years ago, when a subsurface ocean of water and ammonia flowed to the surface, and then solidified.

== See also ==
- List of geological features on Charon
