= Charon (moon) =

Largest natural satellite of Pluto

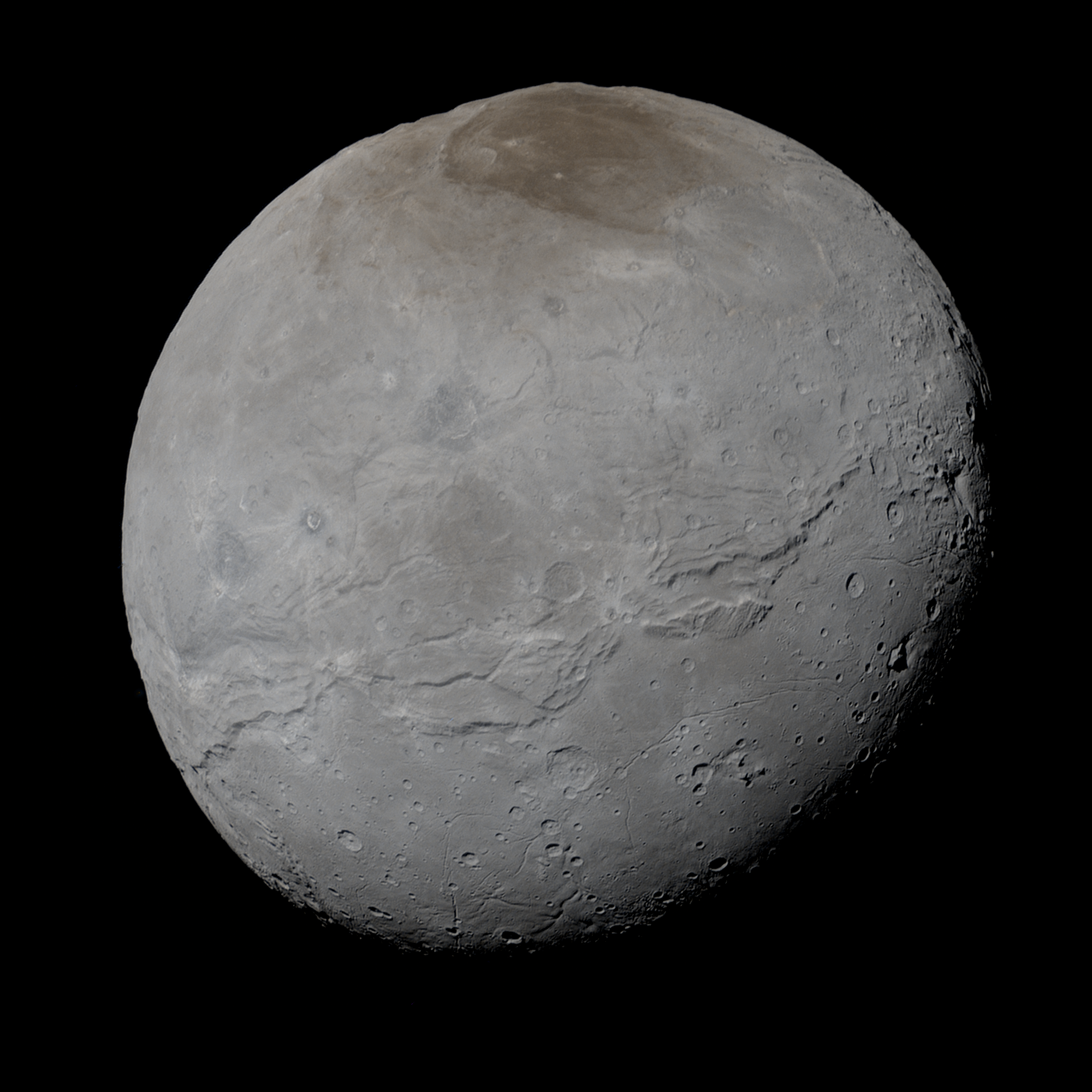
- Charon in true color as imaged by the New Horizons spacecraft on July 14, 2015.

Discovery
- Discovered by: James W. Christy
- Discovery date: June 22, 1978

Designations
- Designation: Pluto I
- Pronunciation: /ˈkɛərɒn, -ən/ KAIR-on, -ən or /ˈʃærən/ SHARR-ən (Note: The former is the anglicized pronunciation of the Ancient Greek: Χάρων, the latter is the discoverer's pronunciation.)
- Named after: Discoverer's wife, Charlene, and Χάρων Kharōn
- Alternative names: S/1978 P 1
- Adjectives: Charonian (Note: From the alternative Latin oblique form Charōnis. Charlton T. Lewis and Charles Short. A Latin Dictionary on Perseus Project.); Charontian, -ean (Note: From the Latin oblique form Charontis. Charlton T. Lewis and Charles Short. A Latin Dictionary on Perseus Project. (cf. Italian, Spanish, and Portuguese Caronte)); Charonean (Note: From the Latin adjectival form Charōnēus. Charlton T. Lewis and Charles Short. A Latin Dictionary on Perseus Project.)

Orbital characteristics
- Epoch 2452600.5 (2002 Nov 22)
- Periapsis: 19 592.61 km
- Apoapsis: 19 598.92 km
- Semi-major axis: 19595.764+0.007 −0.008 km (planetocentric); 17181.0 km (barycentric)
- Eccentricity: 0.000161
- Orbital period (sidereal): 6.387221+0.000005 −0.000003 d (6 d, 9 h, 17 m, 35.89 ± 0.35 s)
- Average orbital speed: 0.21 km/s (Note: Calculated on the basis of other parameters.)
- Inclination: 0.080° (to Pluto's equator); 119.591°±0.014° (to Pluto's orbit); 112.783°±0.014° (to the ecliptic)
- Longitude of ascending node: 223.046°±0.014° (to vernal equinox)
- Satellite of: Pluto

Physical characteristics
- Mean radius: 606.0±0.5 km (0.095 Earths, 0.51 Plutos)
- Flattening: <0.5%
- Surface area: 4.6×10^{6} km^{2} (0.0090 Earths)
- Volume: (9.32±0.14)×10^{8} km^{3} (0.00086 Earths)
- Mass: (1.5897±0.0045)×10^{21} kg (2.66×10^{−4} Earths) (12.2% of Pluto)
- Mean density: 1.705±0.006 g/cm^{3}
- Surface gravity: 0.288 m/s^{2}
- Escape velocity: 0.59 km/s 0.37 mi/s
- Synodic rotation period: synchronous
- Albedo: ~0.38 (locally 0.20–0.73); 0.25 ± 0.03 Bond
- Temperature: −220 °C (53 K)
- Apparent magnitude: 16.8
- Absolute magnitude (H): 1
- Angular diameter: 55 milli-arcsec

Charon (/ˈkɛərɒn, -ən/ KAIR-on, -ən or /ˈʃærən/ SHARR-ən), formal designation (134340) Pluto I, is the largest of the five known natural satellites of the dwarf planet Pluto. It has a mean radius of 606 km (377 mi). Charon is a planetary-mass moon and the sixth-largest known trans-Neptunian object after Pluto, Eris, Haumea, Makemake, and Gonggong. It was discovered in 1978 at the United States Naval Observatory in Washington, D.C., using photographic plates taken at the United States Naval Observatory Flagstaff Station (NOFS).

With half the diameter and one-eighth the mass of Pluto, Charon is a very large moon in comparison to its parent body. Its gravitational influence is such that the barycenter of the Plutonian system lies outside Pluto, and the two bodies are tidally locked to each other. The dwarf planet systems Pluto–Charon and Eris–Dysnomia and the dwarf planet candidate system Salacia–Actaea are the only known examples of mutual tidal locking in the Solar System, though it is likely that Orcus–Vanth is another.

The reddish-brown cap of the north pole of Charon is composed of tholins, organic macromolecules that may be essential ingredients of life. These tholins were produced from methane, nitrogen, and related gases which may have been released by cryovolcanic eruptions on the moon, or may have been transferred over 19,000 km (12,000 mi) from the atmosphere of Pluto to the orbiting moon.

The New Horizons spacecraft, the only probe to visit the Pluto system, approached Charon to within 27,000 km (17,000 mi) in 2015.

== Discovery ==
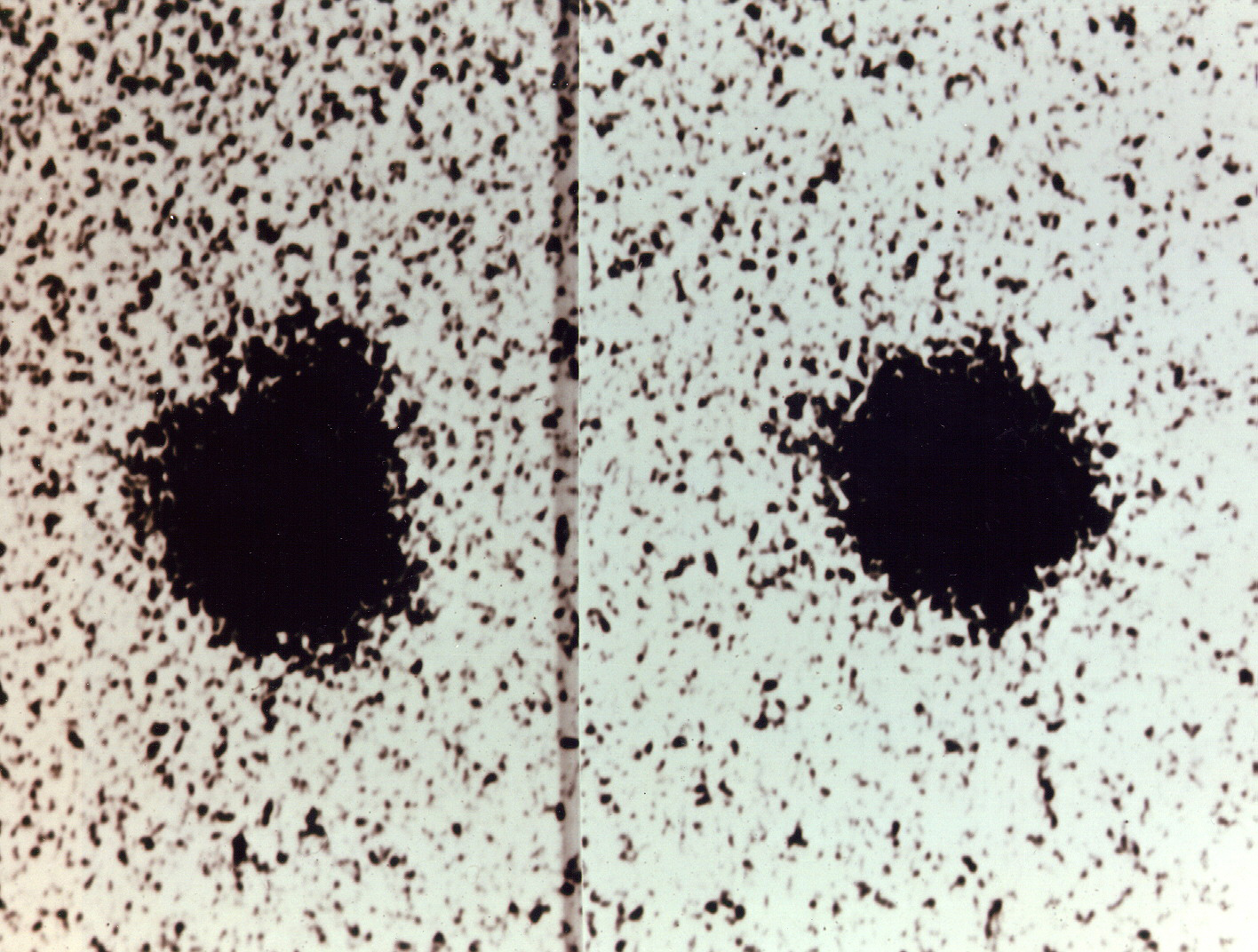
Charon's discovery at the Naval Observatory Flagstaff Station as a time-varying bulge on the image of Pluto (seen near the top at left, but absent on the right). Negative image.

Charon was discovered by United States Naval Observatory astronomer James Christy, using the 1.55-meter (61 in) telescope at United States Naval Observatory Flagstaff Station (NOFS). On June 22, 1978, he had been examining highly magnified images of Pluto on photographic plates taken with the telescope two months prior. Christy noticed that a slight elongation appeared periodically. The bulge was confirmed on plates dating back to April 29, 1965. Subsequent observations of Pluto determined that the bulge was due to a smaller accompanying body. The periodicity of the bulge corresponded to Pluto's rotation period, which was previously known from Pluto's light curve. This indicated a synchronous orbit, which strongly suggested that the bulge effect was real and not spurious. This resulted in reassessments of Pluto's size, mass, and other physical characteristics because the calculated mass and albedo of the Pluto–Charon system had previously been attributed to Pluto alone. The International Astronomical Union formally announced Christy's discovery to the world on July 7, 1978.

Doubts about Charon's existence were erased when it and Pluto entered a five-year period of mutual eclipses and transits between 1985 and 1990. This occurs when the Pluto–Charon orbital plane is edge-on as seen from Earth, which only happens at two intervals in Pluto's 248-year orbital period. It was fortuitous that one of these intervals happened to occur soon after Charon's discovery.

== Name ==
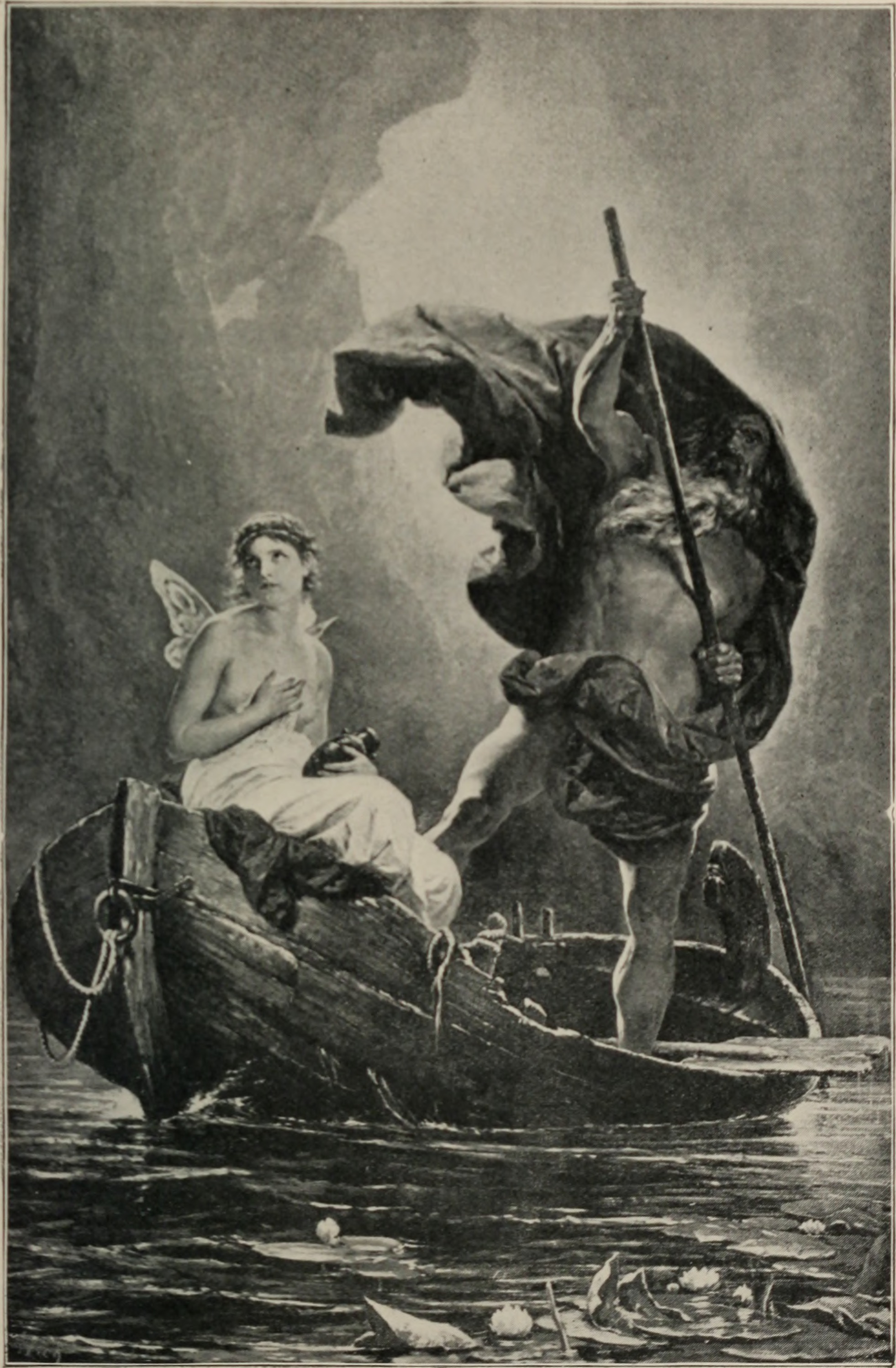
Psyche with Charon in his lunate boat, the basis of the symbol

Charon was first given the temporary designation S/1978 P 1, after its discovery, following the then recently instituted convention. On June 24, 1978, Christy first suggested Oz, then the name Charon as a scientific-sounding version of his wife Charlene's nickname, "Char". Although colleagues at the Naval Observatory proposed Persephone, Christy stuck with Charon after discovering that it was serendipitously the name of an appropriate mythological figure: Charon (/ˈkɛərən/; Ancient Greek: Χάρων) is the ferryman of the dead, closely associated with the god Pluto. The IAU officially adopted the name in late 1985, and it was announced on January 3, 1986.

Coincidentally, nearly four decades before Charon's discovery, science fiction author Edmond Hamilton had invented three moons of Pluto for his 1940 novel Calling Captain Future and named them Charon, Styx, and Cerberus; Styx and Kerberos are the two smallest Plutonian moons, and were named in 2013.

There is minor debate over the preferred pronunciation of the name. The mythological figure is pronounced with a /k/ sound, and this is often followed for the moon as well. However, Christy himself pronounced the initial ⟨ch⟩ as a /ʃ/ sound, as he had named the moon after his wife Charlene. Many English-speaking astronomers follow the classical convention, but others follow Christy's, (Note: Astronomer Mike Brown can be heard pronouncing it [ˈʃɛɹᵻn] in ordinary conversation on the KCET interview ["Julia Sweeney and Michael E. Brown". Hammer Conversations: KCET podcast. 2007. Archived from the original on October 6, 2008.] at 42min 48sec.) and that is the prescribed pronunciation at NASA and of the New Horizons team. (Note: Hal Weaver, who led the team that discovered Nix and Hydra, also pronounces it [ˈʃɛɹᵻn] on the Discovery Science Channel documentary Passport to Pluto, premiered 2006-01-15.)

Planetary moons other than Earth's were never given symbols in the astronomical literature. Denis Moskowitz, a software engineer who designed most of the dwarf planet symbols, proposed a symbol for Charon that combines the high orb of Pluto's bident symbol with a crescent, suggesting both Charon as a moon and the mythological Charon's boat crossing the river Styx. This symbol is not widely used, but it coincidentally matches a Pluto symbol U+2BD5 ⯕ PLUTO FORM FOUR used in Uranian astrology.

== Orbit ==
A simulated view of the Pluto–Charon system showing that Pluto orbits a point outside itself. Also visible is the mutual tidal locking between the two bodies.

Charon and Pluto orbit each other every 6.387 days. The two objects are gravitationally locked to one another, so each keeps the same face towards the other. This is a case of mutual tidal locking, as opposed to that of the Earth and the Moon, where the Moon always shows the same face to Earth, but not vice versa. The average distance between Charon and Pluto is about 19,596 kilometres (12,176 mi). However, Pluto moves with respect to the barycenter of the system as well, as the barycenter's distance from the center of Pluto is larger than the radius of Pluto. Therefore, Charon is not as far from the true center of the Pluto–Charon system, at only 17,181 kilometres (10,676 mi).

The discovery of Charon allowed astronomers to calculate accurately the mass of the Plutonian system, and mutual occultations revealed their sizes. However, neither indicated the two bodies' individual masses. Those could only be estimated, until the discovery of Pluto's outer moons in late 2005. Details in the orbits of the outer moons then revealed that Charon has approximately 12% of the mass of Pluto.

== Formation ==
Simulation work published in 2005 by Robin Canup suggested that Charon could have been formed by a collision around 4.5 billion years ago, much like Earth and the Moon. In this model, a large Kuiper belt object struck Pluto at high velocity, destroying itself and blasting off much of Pluto's outer mantle, and Charon coalesced from the debris. However, such an impact should result in an icier Charon and rockier Pluto than scientists have found. It is now thought that Pluto and Charon might have been two bodies that collided before going into orbit around each other. The collision would have been violent enough to boil off volatile ices like methane (CH_{4}) but not violent enough to have destroyed either body. The very similar density of Pluto and Charon implies that the parent bodies were not fully differentiated when the impact occurred. The two bodies would have been stuck for a while, before separating from each other again, while remaining gravitationally bound. The internal heat in both bodies, created from both the collision and then the tidal friction as they separated, would have been sufficient to create Pluto's subsurface ocean without the need for radioactive elements.

== Physical characteristics ==
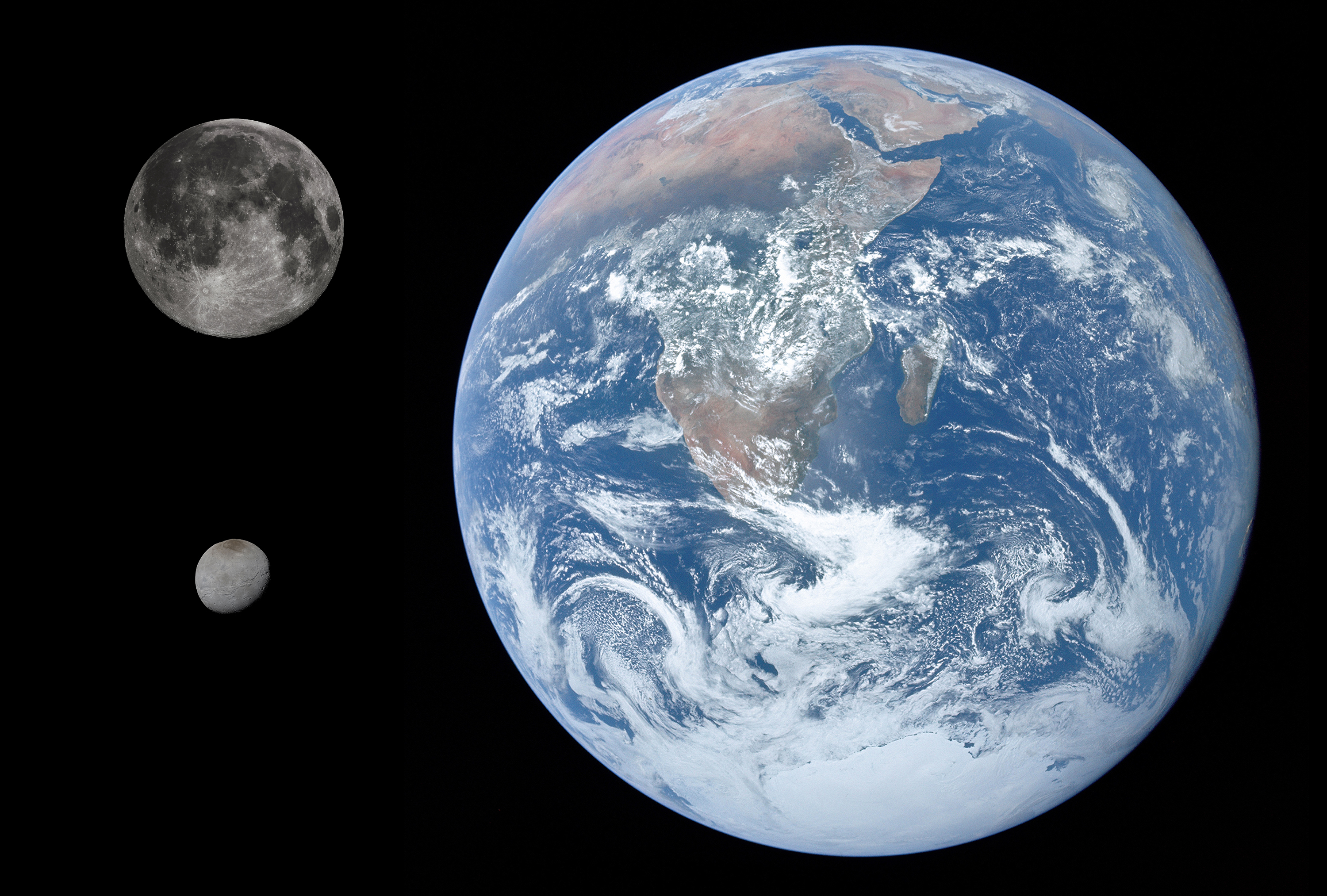
Size comparisons: Earth, the Moon, and Charon

Charon's diameter is 1,212 kilometres (753 mi), just over half that of Pluto. Larger than the dwarf planet Ceres, it is the twelfth-largest natural satellite in the Solar System. Charon is similar in size to Uranus's moons Umbriel and Ariel. Charon's slow rotation means that there should be little flattening or tidal distortion if Charon is sufficiently massive to be in hydrostatic equilibrium. Any deviation from a perfect sphere is too small to have been detected by observations by the New Horizons mission. This is in contrast to Iapetus, a Saturnian moon similar in size to Charon but with a pronounced oblateness dating to early in its history. The lack of such oblateness in Charon could mean that it is currently in hydrostatic equilibrium, or simply that its orbit approached its current one early in its history, when it was still warm.

Based on mass updates from observations made by New Horizons the mass ratio of Charon to Pluto is 0.1218:1. This is much larger than the Moon to the Earth: 0.0123:1. Because of the high mass ratio, the barycenter is outside of the radius of Pluto, and the Pluto–Charon system has been referred to as a dwarf double planet. With four smaller satellites in orbit about the two larger worlds, the Pluto–Charon system has been considered in studies of the orbital stability of circumbinary planets.

=== Internal structure ===
Two proposed models of Charon's interior
- A possible outcome of the hot start model, with two different levels of silicate 'fines,' or micron-sized particles
- A possible outcome of the cold start model

Charon's volume and mass allow calculation of its density, 1.702±0.017 g/cm^{3}, from which it can be determined that Charon is slightly less dense than Pluto and suggesting a composition of 55% rock to 45% ice (± 5%), whereas Pluto is about 70% rock. The difference is considerably lower than that of most suspected collisional satellites.

Following the New Horizons flyby, numerous discovered features on Charon's surface strongly indicated that Charon is differentiated, and may even have had a subsurface ocean early in its history. The past resurfacing observed on Charon's surface indicated that Charon's ancient subsurface ocean may have fed large-scale cryoeruptions on the surface, erasing many older features. As a result, two broad competing views on the nature of Charon's interior arose: the so-called hot start model, where Charon's formation is rapid and involves a violent impact with Pluto, and the cold start model, where Charon's formation is more gradual and involves a less violent impact with Pluto.

According to the hot start model, Charon accreted rapidly (within ~10^{4} years) from the circumplanetary disc, resulting from a highly-disruptive giant impact scenario. This rapid time scale prevents the heat from accretion from radiating away during the formation process, leading to the partial melting of Charon's outer layers. However, Charon's crust failed to reach a melt fraction where complete differentiation occurs, leading to the crust retaining part of its silicate content upon freezing. A liquid subsurface ocean forms during or soon after Charon's accretion and persists for approximately 2 billion years before freezing, possibly driving cryovolcanic resurfacing of Vulcan Planitia. Radiogenic heat from Charon's core could then melt a second subsurface ocean composed of a eutectic water-ammonia mixture before it too freezes, possibly driving the formation of Kubrick Mons and other similar features. These freezing cycles could increase Charon's size by >20 km, leading to the formation of the complex tectonic features observed in Serenity Chasma and Oz Terra.

In contrast, the cold start model argues that a large subsurface ocean early in Charon's history is not necessary to explain Charon's surface features, and instead proposes that Charon may have been homogeneous and more porous at formation. According to the cold start model, as Charon's interior begins to warm due to radiogenic heating and heating from serpentinization, a phase of contraction begins, largely driven by compaction in Charon's interior. Approximately 100–200 million years after formation, enough heat builds up to where a subsurface ocean melts, leading to rapid differentiation, further contraction, and the hydration of core rocks. Despite this melting, a pristine crust of amorphous water ice on Charon remains. After this period, differentiation continues, but the core can no longer absorb more water, and thus freezing at the base of Charon's mantle begins. This freezing drives a period of expansion until Charon's core becomes warm enough to begin compaction, starting a final period of contraction. Serenity Chasma may have formed from the expansion episode, whilst the final contraction episode may have given rise to the arcuate ridges observed in Neverland Regio.

=== Surface ===
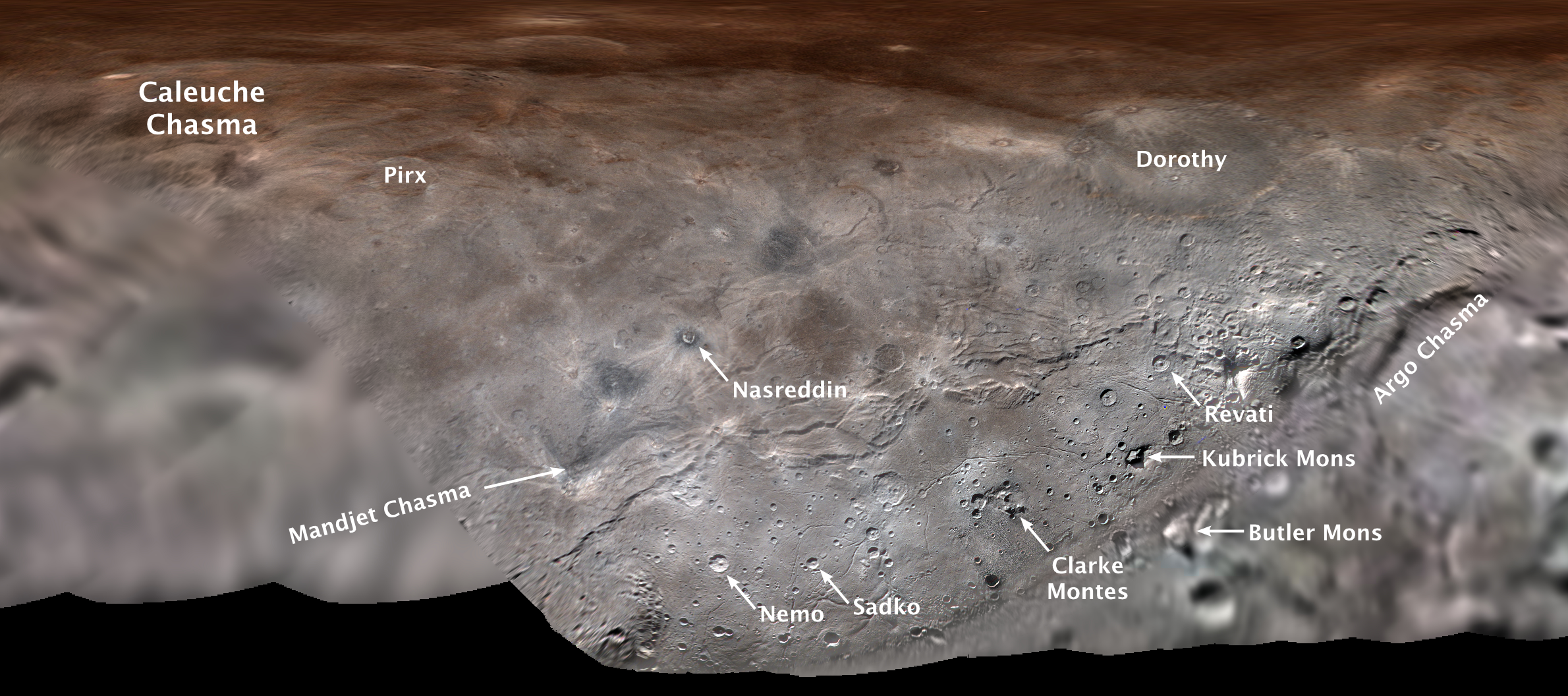
A map of Charon with IAU names

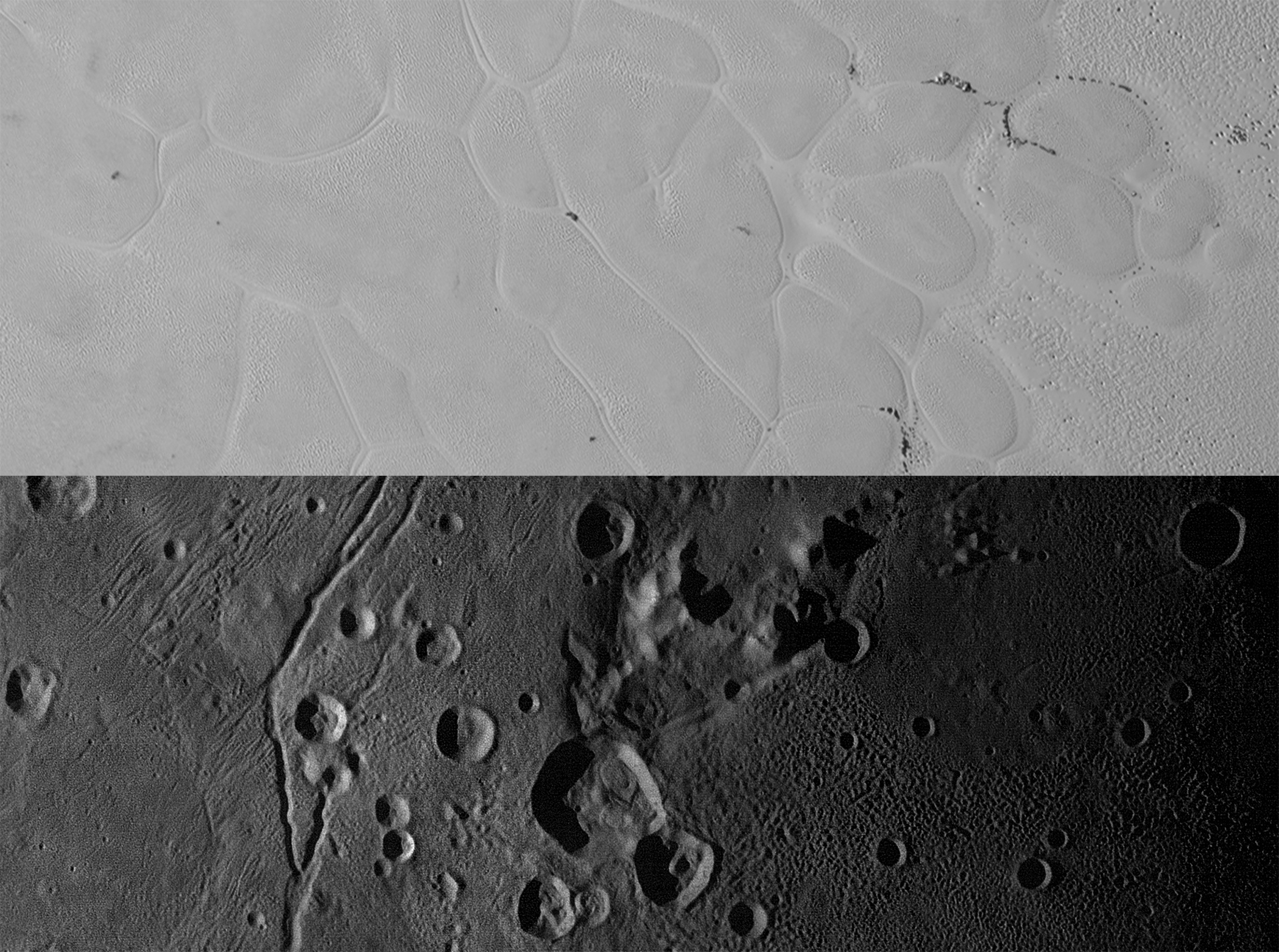
Comparison between Pluto's Sputnik Planitia and Charon's informally named Vulcan Planitia

Unlike Pluto's surface, which is composed of nitrogen and methane ices, Charon's surface appears to be dominated by the less volatile water ice.

In 2007, observations by the Gemini Observatory detected patches of ammonia hydrates and water crystals on the surface of Charon that suggested the presence of active cryogeysers and cryovolcanoes. The fact that the ice was still in crystalline form suggested it may have been deposited recently, as it was expected that solar radiation would have degraded it to an amorphous state after roughly thirty thousand years. However, following new data from the New Horizons flyby, no active cryovolcanoes or geysers were detected. Later research has also called into question the cryovolcanic origin for the crystalline water ice and ammonia features, with some researchers instead proposing that ammonia may be replenished passively from underground material.

Photometric mapping of Charon's surface shows a latitudinal trend in albedo, with a bright equatorial band and darker poles. The north polar region is dominated by Neverland Regio, a very large dark area, formerly nicknamed "Mordor" by the New Horizons team. The favored explanation for this feature is that it is formed by condensation of gases that escaped from Pluto's atmosphere. In winter, the temperature is −258 °C, and these gases, which include nitrogen, carbon monoxide, and methane, condense into their solid forms; when these ices are subjected to solar radiation, they chemically react to form various reddish tholins. Later, when the area is again heated by the Sun as Charon's seasons change, the temperature at the pole rises to −213 °C, resulting in the volatiles sublimating and escaping Charon, leaving only the tholins behind. Over millions of years, the residual tholin builds up thick layers, obscuring the icy crust. In addition to Neverland Regio, New Horizons found evidence of extensive past geology that suggests that Charon is probably differentiated; in particular, the southern hemisphere has fewer craters than the northern and is considerably less rugged, suggesting that a massive resurfacing event—perhaps prompted by the partial or complete freezing of an internal ocean—occurred at some point in the past and removed many of the earlier craters.

Charon has a system of extensive grabens and scarps, such as Serenity Chasma, which extend as an equatorial belt for at least 1,000 km (620 mi). Argo Chasma potentially reaches as deep as 9 km (6 mi), with cliffs that may rival Verona Rupes on Miranda for the title of the tallest cliff in the Solar System.

=== Hypothesized exosphere ===
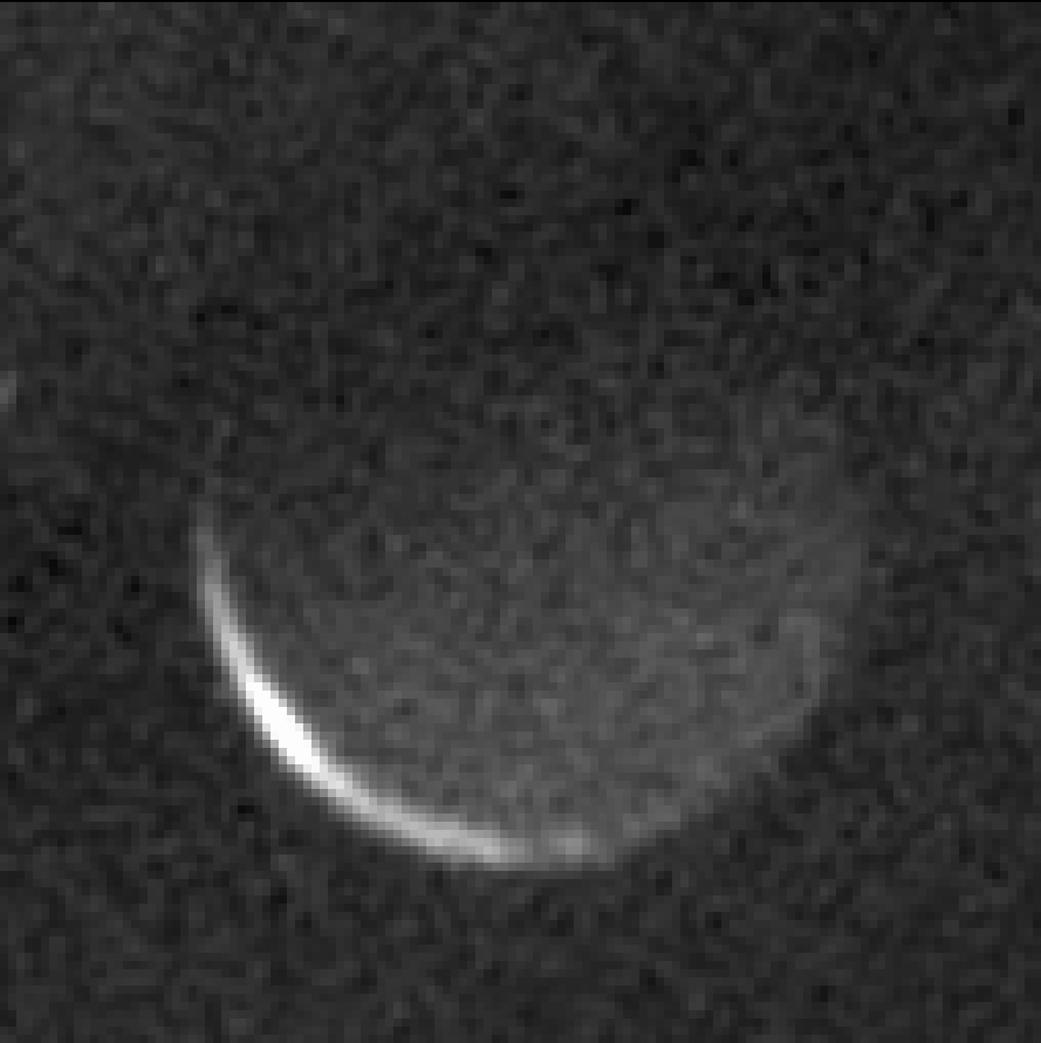
Charon's night side seen by New Horizons

In contrast to Pluto, Charon has no significant atmosphere. There has been speculation about an extremely thin exosphere surrounding the moon contributing to the formation of dark regions such as Neverland Regio. The strong seasons experienced by Pluto and Charon could provide brief periods of exosphere formation as methane sublimates on Charon, interspersed by centuries of dormancy.

Pluto does have a thin but significant atmosphere, which Charon's gravitation might pull toward Charon's surface. The gas, specifically nitrogen, is mostly caught in the combined center of gravity between the two bodies before reaching Charon, but any gas that does reach Charon is held closely against the surface. The gas is mostly made up of ions of nitrogen, but the amounts are negligible compared to the total of Pluto's atmosphere.

The many spectral signatures of ice formations on the surface of Charon have led some to believe that the ice formations could supply an atmosphere, but atmosphere supplying formations have not been confirmed yet. Many scientists theorize that these ice formations could be concealed out of direct sight, either in deep craters or beneath Charon's surface. Charon's relatively low gravity, due to its low mass, causes any atmosphere that might be present to rapidly escape the surface into space. Even through stellar occultation, which is used to probe the atmosphere of stellar bodies, scientists cannot confirm an existing atmosphere; this was tested in 1986 while attempting to perform stellar occultation testing on Pluto. Charon also acts as a protector for Pluto's atmosphere, blocking the solar wind that would normally collide with Pluto and damage its atmosphere. Since Charon blocks the solar wind, its own atmosphere is diminished, instead of Pluto's. This effect is also a potential explanation for Charon's lack of atmosphere; the solar wind removes gases faster than they can accumulate. It is still possible for Charon to have an atmosphere, as Pluto transfers some of its atmospheric gas to Charon, from where it tends to escape into space. Assuming Charon's density is 1.71 g/cm^{3}, it would have a surface gravity of 0.6 of Pluto's. It also has a higher mean molecular weight than Pluto and a lower exobase surface temperature, so that the gases in its atmosphere would not escape as rapidly from Charon as they do from Pluto.

There has been significant proof of CO_{2} gas and H_{2}O vapor on the surface of Charon, but these vapors are not sufficient for a viable atmosphere due to their low vapor pressures. Pluto's surface has abundant ice formations, but these are volatile, as they are made up of volatile substances like methane. These volatile ice structures cause a good deal of geological activity, keeping its atmosphere constant, while Charon's ice structures are mainly made up of water and carbon dioxide, much less volatile substances that can stay dormant and not affect the atmosphere much.

== Observation and exploration ==
Historical observations of Charon

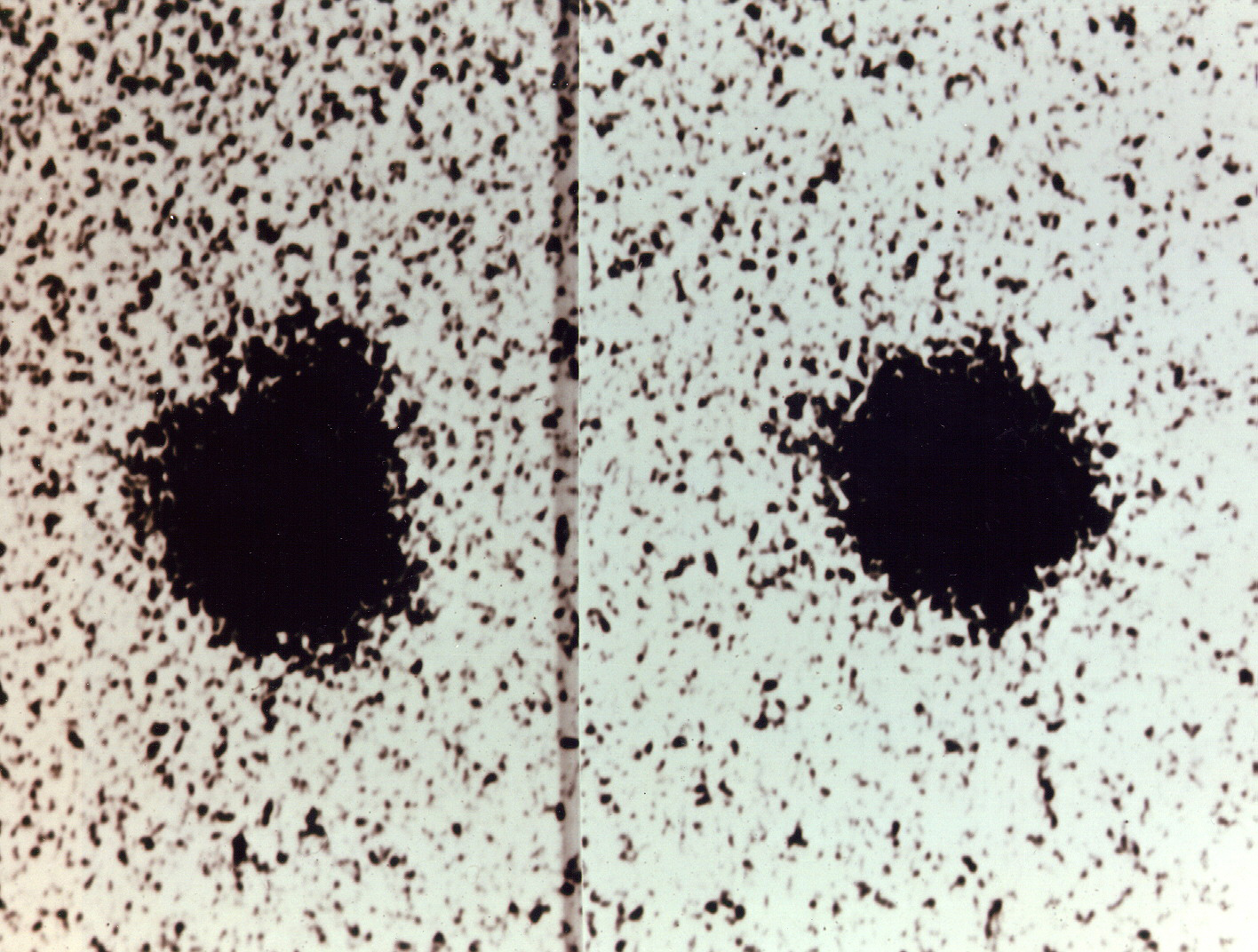
(1) Discovery;
1978

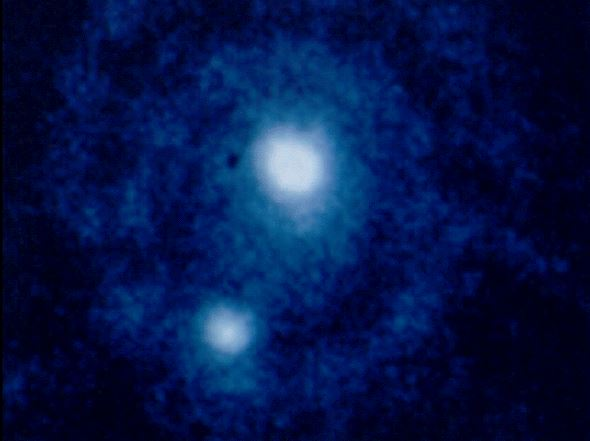
(2) HST – before correction;
1990

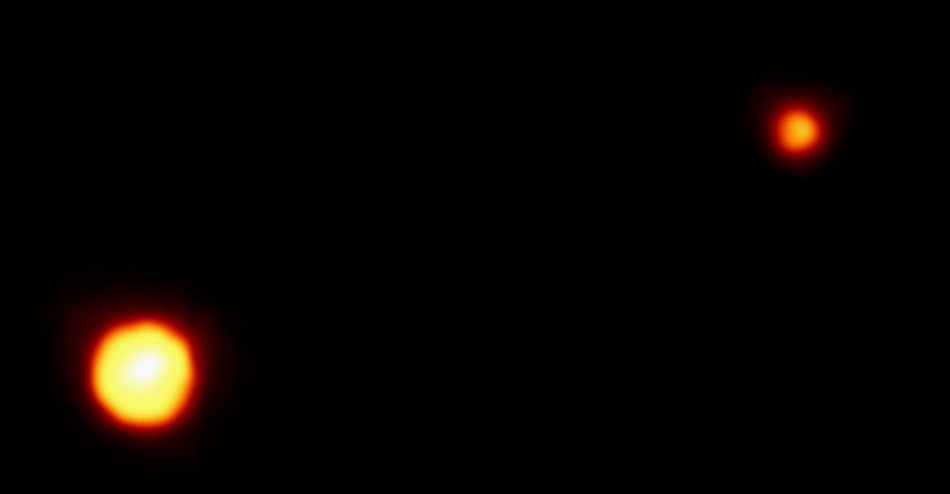
(3) HST – after correction;
1994

(4) 1st color animated view;
2015

Since the first blurred images of the moon (1), images showing Pluto and Charon resolved into separate disks were taken for the first time by the Hubble Space Telescope in the 1990s (2). The telescope was responsible for the best, yet low-quality images of the moon. In 1994, the clearest picture of the Pluto–Charon system showed two distinct and well-defined disks (3). The image was taken by Hubble's Faint Object Camera (FOC) when the system was 4.4 billion kilometers (2.6 billion miles) away from Earth Later, the development of adaptive optics made it possible to resolve Pluto and Charon into separate disks using ground-based telescopes. Although ground-based observation is very challenging, a group of amateur astronomers in Italy used a 14-inch telescope in 2008 to successfully resolve Charon in an image of Pluto.

In June 2015, the New Horizons spacecraft captured consecutive images of the Pluto–Charon system as it approached it. The images were put together in an animation. It was the best image of Charon to that date (4). In July 2015, the New Horizons spacecraft made its closest approach to the Pluto system. It is the only spacecraft to date to have visited and studied Charon. Charon's discoverer James Christy, his wife (and Charon name inspiration) Charlene Christy, and the children of Clyde Tombaugh were guests at the Johns Hopkins Applied Physics Laboratory during the New Horizons closest approach.

== Classification ==
The center of mass (barycenter) of the Pluto–Charon system lies outside either body. Because neither object truly orbits the other, and Charon has 12.2% of the mass of Pluto, it has been argued that Charon should be considered to be part of a binary planet with Pluto. The International Astronomical Union (IAU) states that Charon is a satellite of Pluto, but the idea that Charon might be classified as a dwarf planet in its own right may be considered at a later date.

In a draft proposal for the 2006 redefinition of the term, the IAU proposed that a planet is defined as a body that orbits the Sun that is large enough for gravitational forces to render the object (nearly) spherical. Under this proposal, Charon would have been classified as a planet, because the draft explicitly defined a planetary satellite as one in which the barycenter lies within the major body. In the final definition, Pluto was reclassified as a dwarf planet, but a formal definition of a planetary satellite was not decided upon. Charon is not in the list of dwarf planets currently recognized by the IAU. Had the draft proposal been accepted, even the Moon would hypothetically be classified as a planet in billions of years when the tidal acceleration that is gradually moving the Moon away from Earth takes it far enough away that the center of mass of the system no longer lies within Earth.

The other moons of Pluto – Nix, Hydra, Kerberos, and Styx – orbit the same barycenter but they are not large enough to be spherical and they are simply considered to be satellites of Pluto (or of Pluto–Charon).

== See also ==
- List of natural satellites
