= Geology of Triton =

Geologic structure and composition of Triton

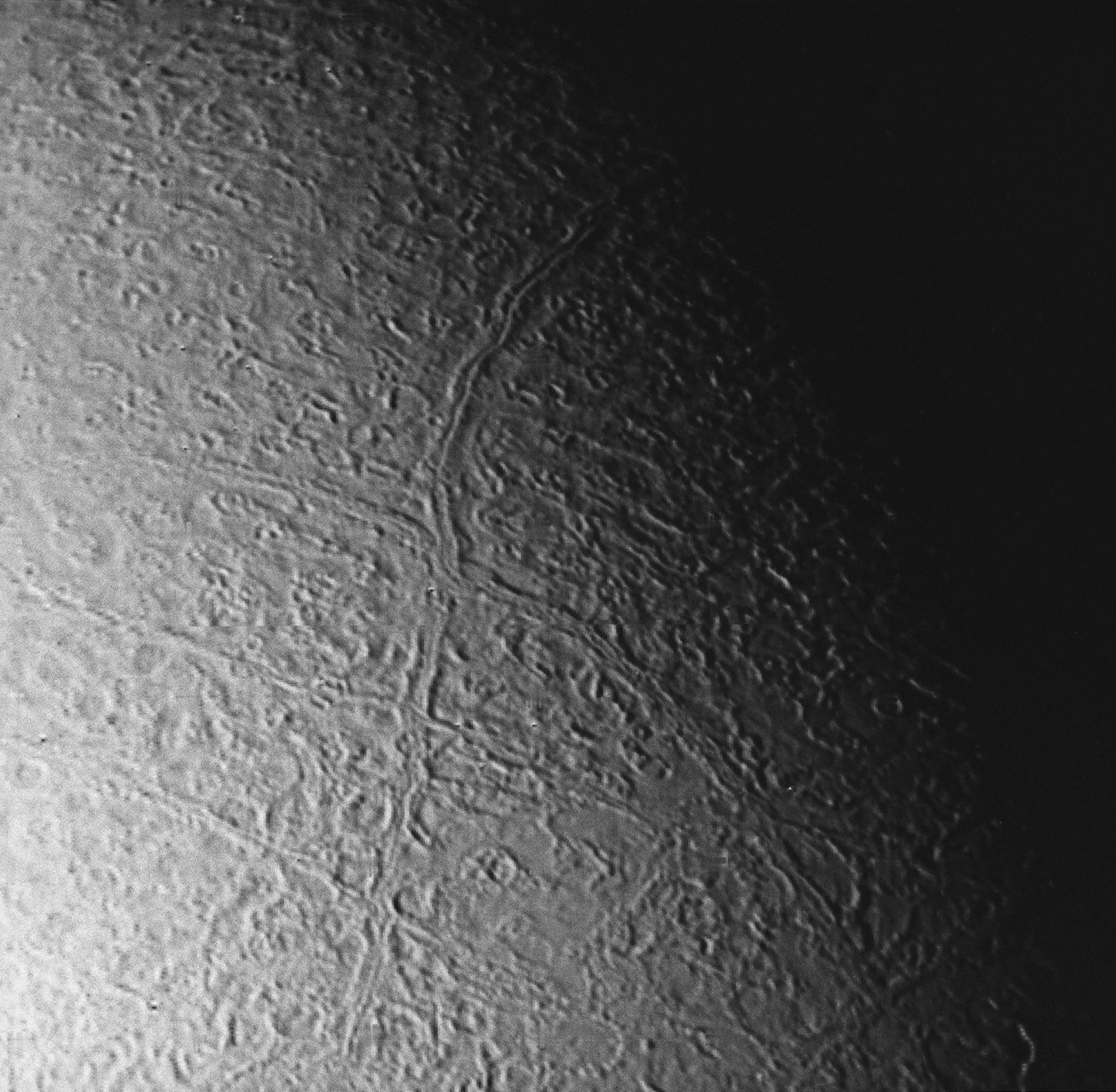
Voyager 2 image of a section of Triton's unusual cantaloupe terrain, cross-cut by Slidr Sulci and Tano Sulci

The geology of Triton encompasses the physical characteristics of the surface, internal structure, and geological history of Neptune's largest moon Triton. With a mean density of 2.061 g/cm^{3}, Triton is roughly 15–35% water ice by mass; Triton is a differentiated body, with an icy solid crust atop a probable subsurface ocean and a rocky core. As a result, Triton's surface geology is largely driven by the dynamics of water ice and other volatiles such as nitrogen and methane. Triton's geology is vigorous, and has been and continues to be influenced by its unusual history of capture, high internal heat, and its thin but significant atmosphere.

Nearly nothing was known of Triton's geology until the Voyager 2 spacecraft flew by the Neptune system in 1989, marking the first and only up-close observations of the moon as of 2024. A number of proposals have been made to follow up on Voyager 2's discoveries, such as Trident and Triton Hopper.

== Geological history ==
Triton's retrograde, highly-inclined orbit around Neptune suggests that Triton is likely a captured dwarf planet from the Kuiper belt, being captured by Neptune possibly during an early era of giant planet migration. Upon capture, Triton likely would have had a highly eccentric orbit around Neptune, inducing extreme tidal heating in Triton's interior. This tidal heating would have likely fully melted Triton, rapidly differentiating it. As Triton's orbit circularized due to tidal damping, tidal heating from eccentricity disappeared. (Note: Triton's orbit is currently almost perfectly circular, with an eccentricity of 0.000016 and a semi-major axis of 354,759 km. Imagining Triton as coplanar with Neptune's equator (and therefore ignoring potential contributions from obliquity tides), tidal heating is calculating using: $$\dot{E}_\text{Tidal} = \frac{k_{2}}{Q} \frac{21}{2} \frac{G M_p^2 R_s^5 n e^2}{a^6}$$ where $R_s$, $n$, $a$, and $e$ are respectively the satellite's mean radius, mean orbital motion, orbital distance, and eccentricity; $G$ is the gravitational constant; $M_p$ is the host (or central) body's mass; and $\frac{k_{2}}{Q}$ represents the ratio of the satellite's second-order Love number and its quality factor. Triton's mean orbital motion is given by: $$n = \sqrt{\frac{ G( M_p  + m_s ) }{a^3}},$$ where $m_s$ is the satellite mass. Using Neptune's mass of 1.024×10^{26} kg, Triton's mass of 2.14×10^{22} kg, Triton's radius of 1,353.4 km, and an assumed $\frac{k_{2}}{Q}$ of 3.3×10^{−4} for Triton, the tidal heating energy from eccentricity is 3.09×10^{7} W, nearly seven orders of magnitude less than Io's roughly 1×10^{14} W.) However, calculated heat flux values for Triton's surface far exceed what radiogenic heating alone could produce, requiring some additional external heat source. Triton may currently be experiencing tidal heating through obliquity tides, providing adequate heat alongside heat generated from radioactive decay in its core to maintain a subsurface ocean at present.

== Surface ==
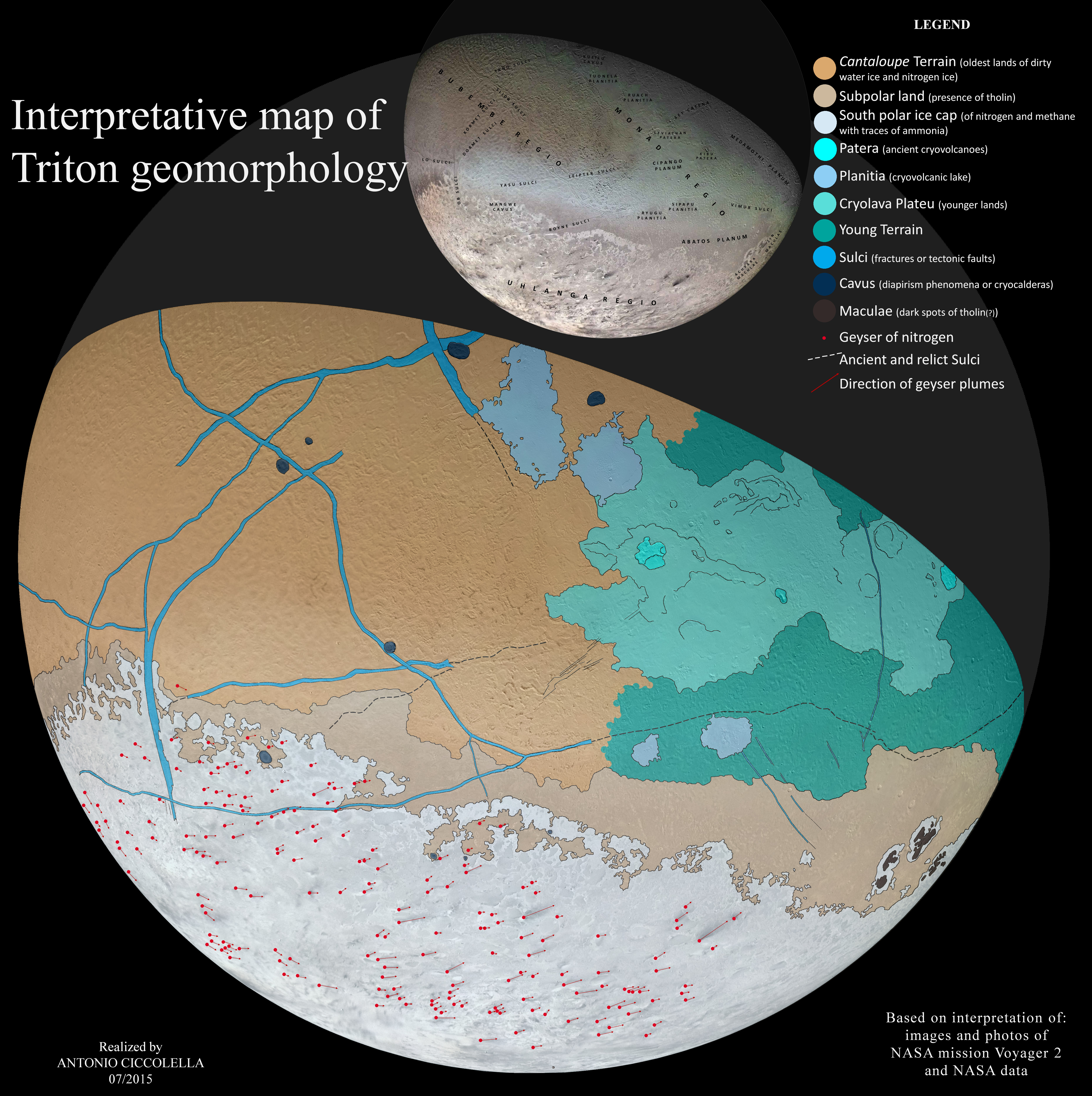
Geological map of Triton's encounter hemisphere

Triton's surface is among the most youthful in the Solar System, with an estimated average surface age of 10–100 million years old, with some regions likely being even younger. Triton's surface is also unusually reflective, with a Bond albedo of 0.76. (Note: Compare Earth's bond albedo of 0.306; a higher number indicates higher reflectivity.) This points towards a long history of vigorous geological activity continuously renewing its surface. Though Triton's crust is expected to be primarily composed of water ice, roughly 55% of Triton's surface is covered in nitrogen ice, with another 10–20% covered by carbon dioxide ice. Triton's surface is quite flat, its topography never varying by more than a kilometer in the imaged areas; calculating from the relaxation of Triton's surface features, Triton's surface heat flux is on the order of 10–100 mW/m^{2}, comparable to Europa's estimated surface heat flux of ~50 mW/m^{2}.

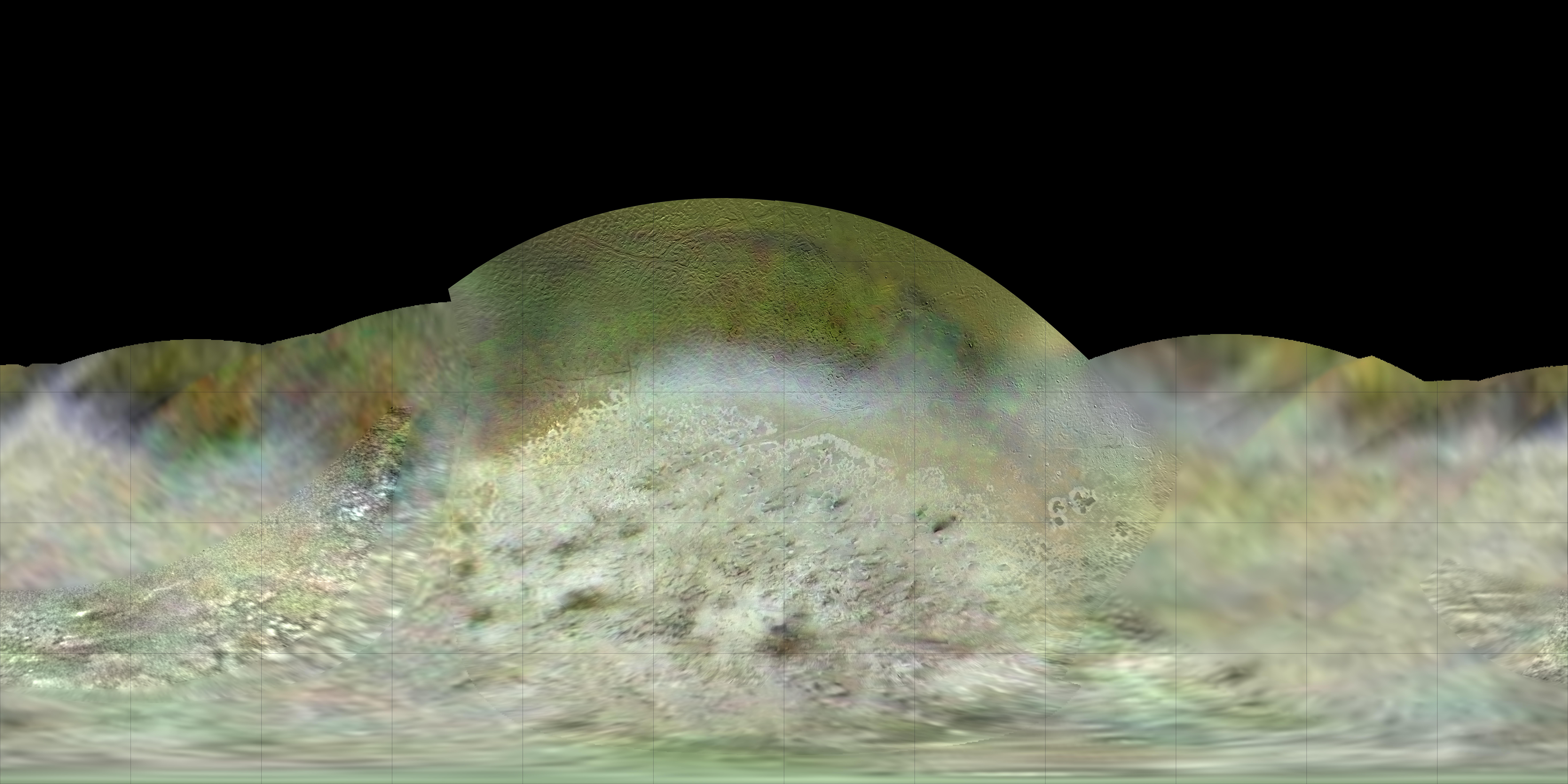
Enhanced-color map of Triton. The black areas represent regions which were not mapped by Voyager 2

=== Polar caps ===
At the time of encounter by the Voyager 2 spacecraft, much of Triton's southern regions was covered by a highly-reflective polar cap of frozen nitrogen which is deposited by its atmosphere. The nitrogen in Triton's polar caps may be kept especially bright by regular phase changes between solid nitrogen's α- and β-phases, fracturing the nitrogen and increasing its reflectivity. Though not directly observed, a northern polar cap is expected to exist. A thinner transparent layer of seasonal nitrogen may be deposited on Triton's lower latitudes, having not yet fractured from the seasonal phase change. Modelling of Triton's seasonal cycles support the existence of a permanent northern polar cap with a thickness of at least several hundred meters, and that Triton's southern polar cap is likely to be over a kilometer thick at its maximum. Topography does not appear to strongly control the extent of Triton's volatile distribution (in strong contrast to Pluto's Sputnik Planitia ice sheet). However, the extent of Triton's polar caps may be significantly influenced by the internal heat flux from Triton's interior, with larger heat fluxes inducing greater asymmetry in the extent of the polar caps.

Between 1977 and the Voyager 2 flyby in 1989, Triton shifted from a reddish color, similar to Pluto, to a far paler hue, suggesting that lighter nitrogen frosts had covered older reddish material. The eruption of volatiles from Triton's equator and their subsequent migration and deposition to the poles may redistribute enough mass over 10,000 years to cause polar wander.

==== South polar plumes ====
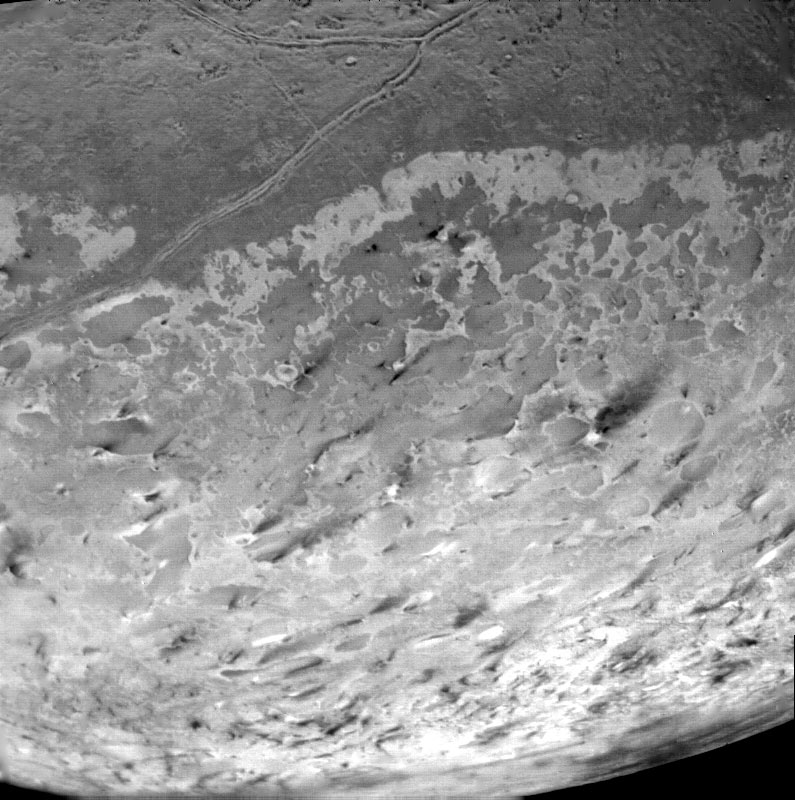
Plume streaks on Triton's southern polar cap

Triton's southern polar cap is marked by numerous streaks of dark material tracing the direction of prevailing winds. Four active plumes stretching 8 km high and ejecting between 10 and 400 kg/s of material were observed by Voyager 2, two of which were designated as the Hili and Mahilani plumes. Each eruption of a Triton geyser may last up to a year, driven by the sublimation of about 100 million m^{3} (3.5 billion ft^{3}) of nitrogen ice over this interval; dust within the erupted material may be deposited more than 150 km downwind from the plume in dark streaks. Voyager 2's images of Triton's southern hemisphere show many such streaks of dark material. Though often described as geysers, the driving mechanism of the plumes remain debated and can be broadly divided between exogenic (geyser-like) and endogenic (cryovolcanic) models.

The solar heating model is centered around the observation that the visible geysers were located between 50° and 57°S; at the time of Voyager 2's flyby, Triton was near the peak of its southern summer. This suggests that solar heating, although very weak at Triton's great distance from the Sun, may play a crucial role in powering the plumes. It is thought that much of Triton's surface consists of a translucent layer of frozen nitrogen overlying a darker substrate, which could create a kind of "solid greenhouse effect". As solar radiation penetrates the translucent layer, it warms the darker substrate, sublimating frozen nitrogen into a gas. Once enough gas pressure builds up, the translucent crust is shattered and the plume erupts. A temperature increase of just 4 K above the ambient surface temperature of 37 K could drive eruptions to the heights observed.

The cryovolcanic and subglacial models propose internal heat drives the eruptions. If the plumes are cryovolcanic in origin, it is possible that they consist primarily of water as opposed to sublimated nitrogen. The high levels of cryovolcanic activity would lead to a young surface relatively rich in water ice, as well as an eruption rate independent from that of solar seasons at the pole. A cryovolcanic origin better explains the estimated output of Triton's plumes, which possibly exceeds 400 kilograms per second (880 lb/s). This is similar to that which is estimated for Enceladus's cryovolcanic plumes at 200 kg/s (440 lb/s); far greater than Mars' geysers at circa 0.2 kg/s (0.44 lb/s), which are largely agreed to be solar-driven. The main challenge for the cryovolcanic model is that all of the 120-odd dark streaks thought to be associated with the plumes were found on the southern ice cap.

The volatile ice sheet basal heating model is proposed to account for both the significant eruption flux and localization to the ice cap, with the caveat that this layer must be at least 100 metres (330 ft) thick. Internal heat from Triton drives melting and convection and possibly localized melting within the nitrogen ice at the pole. These 'hot spots' in the ice rise to the surface or move to the margins of the ice sheet, where they explosively sublimate once pressure is released.

=== Dark maculae ===
Bordering Triton's southern polar cap east of Abatos Planum are a sequence of irregularly-shaped dark spots, or maculae, surrounded by a "halo" of bright material. The two most prominent dark maculae are Akupara Macula and Zin Macula, which are roughly 100 km across and have halos extending a further 20 to 30 km from the edges of their dark centers. The dark material is most likely composed of organic materials in the form of tholins.

=== Cantaloupe terrain ===
Much of Triton's surface, mostly in Bubembe Regio, is dominated by a unique and unusually textured terrain informally called cantaloupe terrain, due to its resemblance to the skin of a North American cantaloupe melon. The cantaloupe terrain appears to be dominated by intersecting folds or faults, with ovoid depressions roughly 30–40 km in diameter. The formation of Triton's cantaloupe terrain may have been driven by diapirism, though other hypotheses invoke collapse or cryovolcanic resurfacing. In contrast to the bright, reflective terrain that covers most of Triton's surface, large portions of the cantaloupe terrain are darkened. The cantaloupe terrain is nearly devoid of craters, with only three probable impact craters identified within cantaloupe terrain regions. Depending on the source of cratering on Triton, this may indicate that the cantaloupe terrain is less than 10 million years old. However, the cantaloupe terrain is stratigraphically younger than other features on Triton, having been partially flooded by cryovolcanic flows.

=== Impact craters ===
Corresponding with Triton's high rates of geological activity and resurfacing, few impact craters have been identified on its surface. Unusually, Triton experiences an extreme dichotomy in crater distribution: almost all of Triton's craters are on its leading hemisphere. The cause of such asymmetry is unclear, but may come from geological activity, the source impactor population, or both. If cratering is primarily from heliocentric objects (such as comets), either craters have been undercounted or a large region of Triton resurfaced and erased the craters, giving a surface age of 10-100 million years old. Alternatively, the cratering may be from debris which orbited Neptune, possibly from the disruption of one of its moons; in this case, Triton's average surface age would be younger than 10 million years old.

== Tectonics ==
Much of Triton's surface is crossed by large-scale faults and ridges, termed sulci, indicating widespread tectonism. Compared to Europa and Ganymede, tectonics appears to be a relatively minor component of Triton's geology. Several ridges, particularly those crossing the cantaloupe terrain regions, superficially resemble the faults on Enceladus and the double-ridged linea of Europa, though the ridges on Triton often suddenly terminate, split, or form up to five parallel segments. These differences from the features observed on Europa and Enceladus indicate that, though superficially similar, the ridges on Triton have slightly different morphologies.

The similarities of Triton's ridges and Europa's lineae have led to the hypothesis that, like Europa's linea, the ridges on Triton may form due to stresses built up in Triton's icy crust through diurnal tides, aided by an ice shell decoupled from its core due to a subsurface ocean. Triton's faults follow general trends; tectonic features trending north–south and east–west tend to be close to the equator, whereas northeast–southwest and northwest–southeast trending faults occur more at higher latitudes.

A second class of faults are simple grabens, or fossae, and include narrow grabens 2–3 kilometers wide such as Yenisey Fossa, about 800 km long, and Jumna Fossae, a pair of valleys 300 km long. Wider grabens ~15 km across include Raz Fossae, a complex series of troughs within Cipango Planum.

== Cryovolcanism ==
Although the nature of Triton's south polar plumes remains debated, Triton hosts many other examples of geologically recent cryovolcanic activity. Nearly all of Triton's observed surface features are likely related to cryovolcanism in some manner.

=== Cryovolcanic plains ===
Triton's surface hosts several extensive resurfaced plains, with the most prominent of these observed being Cipango Planum. Cipango Planum is a large, young, smooth cryovolcanic plain that appears to partially cover the older cantaloupe terrain. Cipango Planum hosts several large depressions, most significantly the ~80 km wide Leviathan Patera and the nearby Kibu Patera. Leviathan Patera in particular appears to be the central vent of Cipango Planum, and likewise may have evolved through multiple eruption stages. The first stage of Leviathan Patera's eruptive history may have been dominated by the eruption of very low-viscosity cryolava, explaining Cipango Planum's very shallow topography (especially when compared to terrestrial shield volcano analogs) and massive expanse. If Leviathan Patera is indeed the primary vent of Cipango Planum, Leviathan Patera would be one of the largest cryovolcanoes or volcanoes in the Solar System, with a total area of at least 490,000 km^{2}, significantly larger than the area of Olympus Mons at 300,000 km^{2}.

Parts of Cipango Planum are disrupted by faults, particularly nearby Leviathan Patera. In particular, Raz Fossae, Kraken Catena, and Set Catena are all oriented roughly radially from Leviathan Patera. Set Catena appears to be a part of a northward extension of Raz Fossae, and may have been the site of explosive cryovolcanic eruptions itself; alternatively, Set Catena and Kraken Catena may have formed as faults beneath Cipango Planum continued rifting, creating collapse craters. The close proximity of Set Catena and Kraken Catena could indicate that Leviathan Patera's eruptive activity has been closely tied to tectonism on Triton.

=== Walled plains ===
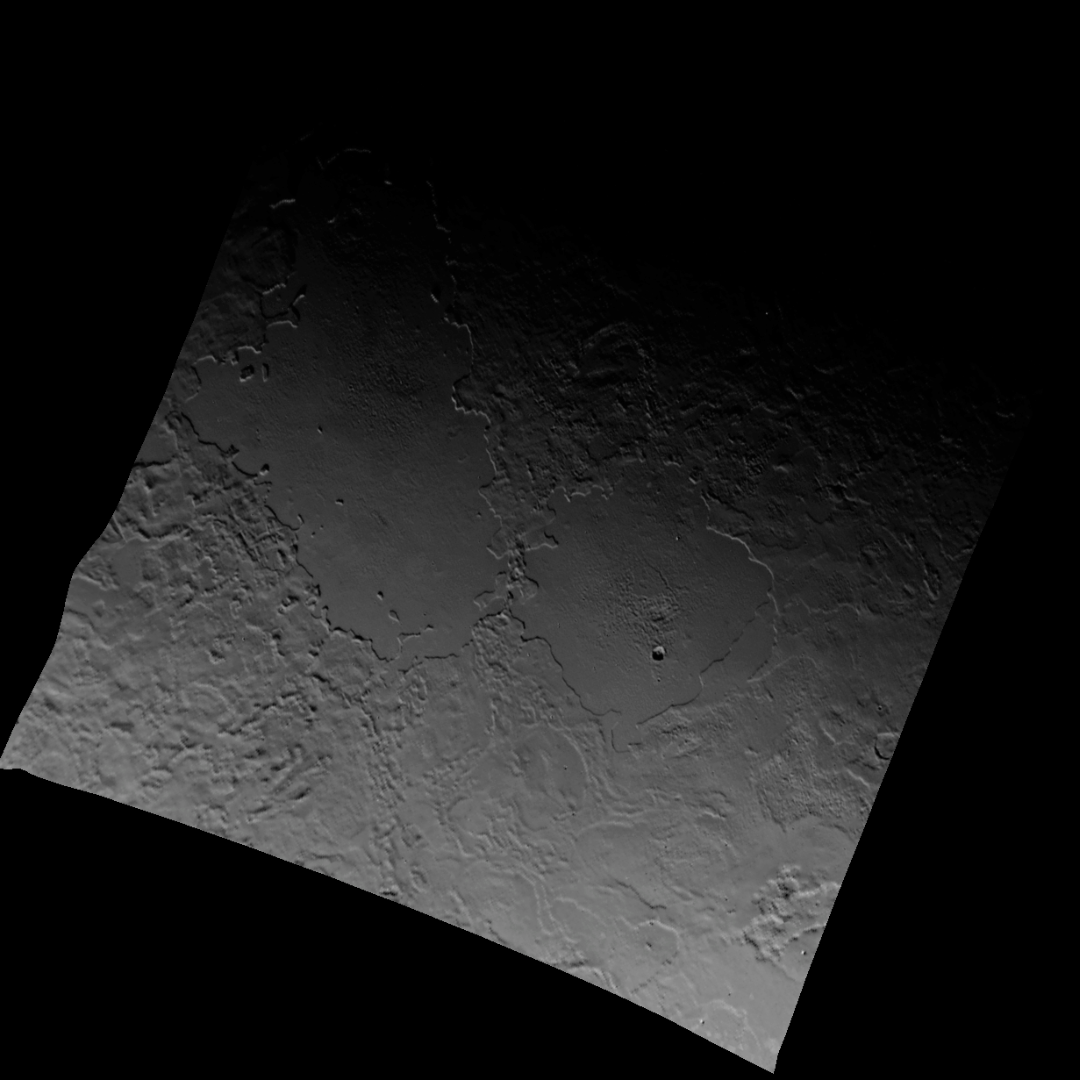
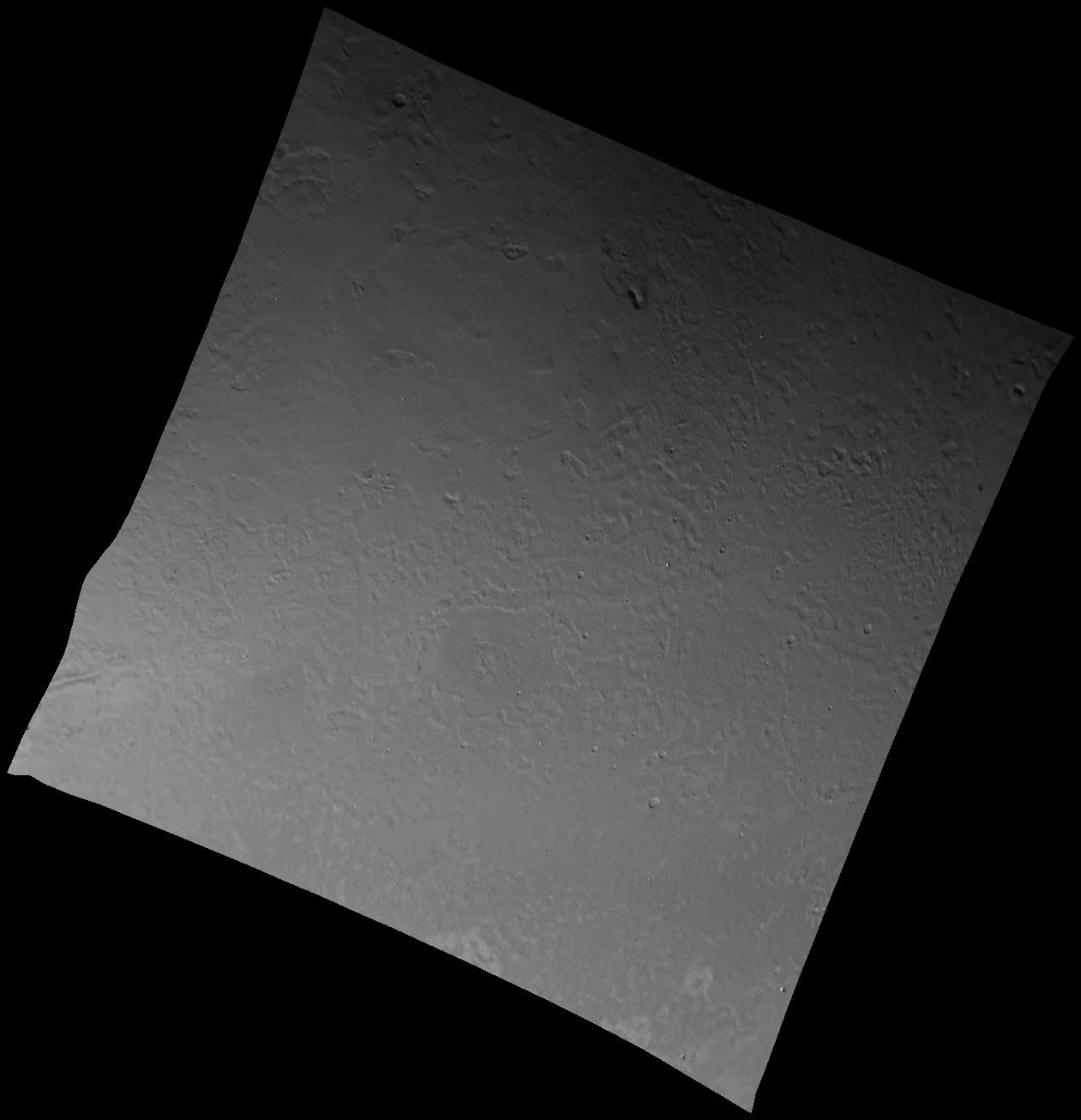
The four walled plains of Triton, grouped into two pairs
- Upper image: Ruach Planitia and Tuonela Planitia, northern pair
- Lower image: Ryugu Planitia and Sipapu Planitia, southern pair

Triton's surface hosts at least four major walled plains between 100 and 400 km in diameter: Ruach Planitia, Tuonela Planitia, Ryugu Planitia, and Sipapu Planitia. These plains are characterized by largely flat floors surrounded by a network of cliffs several hundreds of meters high and crenulated, or irregularly wavy, in profile. All four walled plains contain a single cluster of concentrated pits and mounds, with the largest pit near the center of each cluster. The unusually flat floor of these walled plains, which embays all irregularities on the plain walls, suggest that the four walled plains may represent dormant cryolava lakes.

Ruach Planitia and Tuonela Planitia, located in northern Monad Regio, cut into both the cantaloupe terrain and the material deposited by Cipango Planum. The center of the roughly circular Ruach Planitia appears to have been warped and hosts a central depression—Dilolo Patera— possibly representing a vent whence cryovolcanic material erupted from. Ruach Planitia's northern wall has also been breached by channels, possibly carved from flowing material; similar, smaller channels also cut across part of Tuonela Planitia's walls.

Ryugu Planitia and Sipapu Planitia are located in south-central Monad Regio, and are smaller than Ruach Planitia and Tuonela Planitia. Both are surrounded by a region of irregular depressions and mounds. Ryugu Planitia's southern wall appears to be incomplete, with smooth material appearing to spill out of Ryugu Planitia's interior plain onto the irregular terrain to the south. Also unique to Ryugu Planitia is its elongated pit cluster which is aligned parallel to a nearby section of the fault Vimur Sulci; the three other plains' pit clusters are all axisymmetric.

== Internal structure ==
The intense tidal heating Triton would have experienced after its capture would have rapidly and thoroughly differentiated Triton, possibly to the point of leading to significant volatile loss. Though Voyager 2 never directly measured the interior structure of Triton, it has been generally inferred that Triton is divided into an outer crust primarily composed of water ice and a rocky-metallic core, separated by a putative subsurface ocean of liquid water and dissolved volatiles.

=== Subsurface ocean ===
Triton likely hosts a global subsurface ocean, and consequently may be habitable. As Triton's orbit is highly circular, the source of heat needed to maintain its liquid water ocean likely comes from a combination of radiogenic heating and heating from obliquity tidal heating. Assuming Triton's ice shell is entirely conductive, Triton's ocean may be 20–30 km beneath its surface.

== See also ==
- List of geological features on Triton
- Geology of Pluto – Geologic structure and composition of Pluto
