= Slidr Sulci =

Tectonic fault on Triton

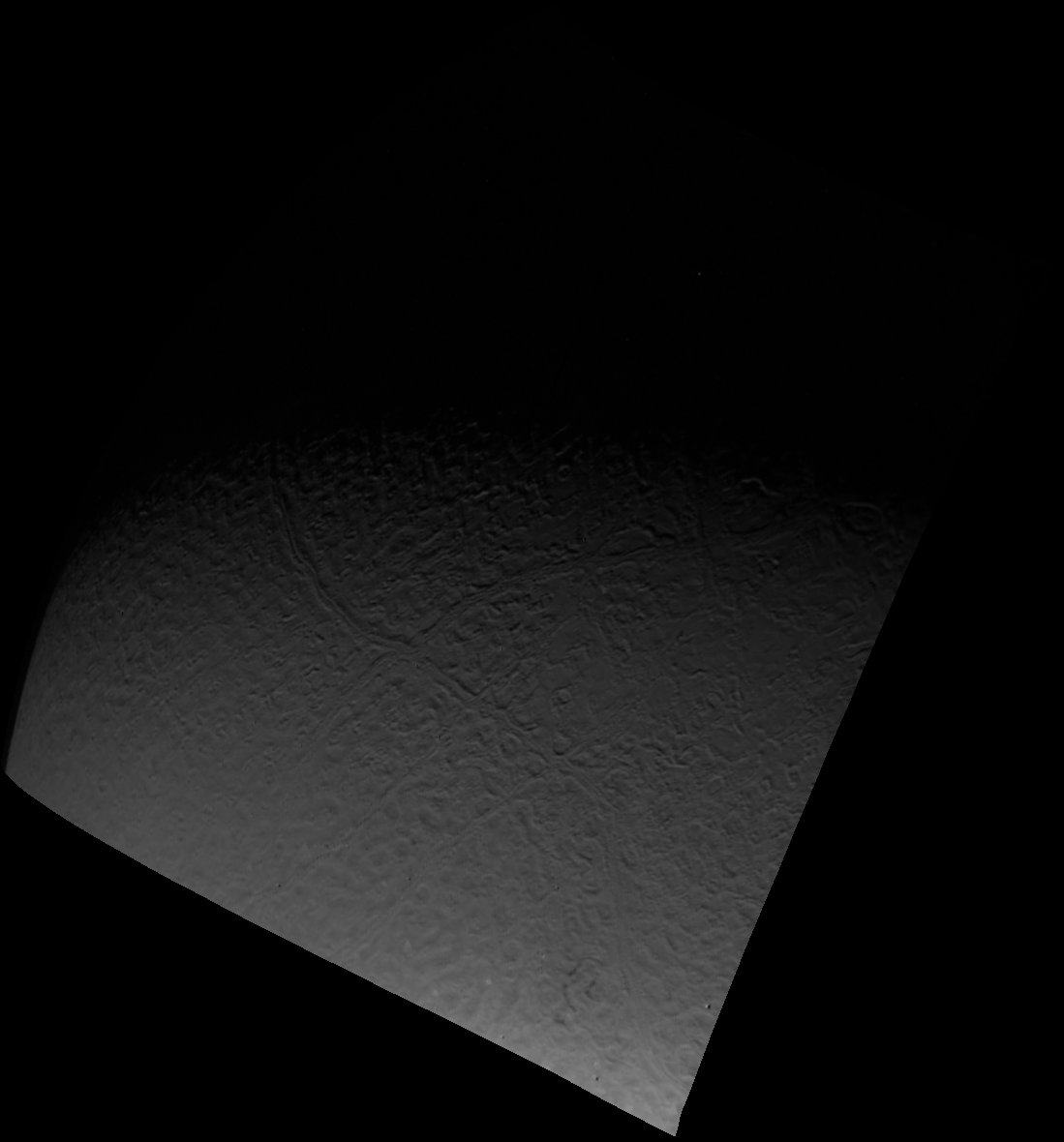
- Slidr Sulci crosses the image from Triton's terminator out to the right of the image. Near center, Slidr Sulci intersects Tano Sulci in an X-junction.
- Feature type: Tectonic fault
- Location: Bubembe Regio, Triton
- Coordinates: 23.50°N 10.00°W
- Width: ~20 km (12 mi)
- Peak: ~200 m (660 ft)
- Discoverer: Voyager 2
- Eponym: River Sliðr

Slidr Sulci is a major tectonic fault on Neptune's largest moon Triton. It crosses a wide variety of terrains on Triton, most prominently the cantaloupe terrain, an unusually textured region resembling the skin of a North American cantaloupe. Branching from a junction with Boynne Sulci, Slidr Sulci consists of a band of parallel ridges for much of its length. The fault is named after the River Sliðr of Norse mythology, whose waters in Hel are filled with swords. The name Slidr Sulci was officially approved by the International Astronomical Union (IAU) in 1991. As with all of Triton's surface features, Slidr Sulci was first observed by the Voyager 2 spacecraft on its flyby of Neptune and Triton in 1989.

== Geology and characteristics ==
Slidr Sulci is one of many long linear ridges on Triton's surface, termed sulci. A global-scale feature, it largely consists of a roughly 20-kilometer-wide band of parallel, discontinuous ridges with gentle slopes that rise to roughly 200 meters high. The total length of Slidr Sulci is not known; it extends from Triton's terminator in Voyager 2 imagery, before terminating at a Y-junction with Boynne Sulci. Slidr Sulci's cross-sectional profile varies along its length; close to the Y-junction with Boynne Sulci, Slidr Sulci appears like a simple U-shaped valley. Travelling northwest along Slidr Sulci, a single narrow ridge begins to appear; the ridge forks at the junction with another fault, travelling south into the plains bordering Triton's south polar cap. Within the sections of Slidr Sulci that lie within the cantaloupe terrain, ridges stand above the surrounding terrain. Multiple ridges often appear, with a section of Slidr Sulci between Hekt Cavus and Rem Maculae consisting of up to eight parallel ridges. Other sections of Slidr Sulci, including one north of Tano Sulci, are located within troughs surrounded by rugged ridges. The ridges are darker than surrounding terrain by roughly 20–50%, similar to the material that divides the numerous "cells" in the cantaloupe terrain.

The formation of Slidr Sulci is unclear, but the ridge's numerous sharp bends indicate that Slidr Sulci is an extensional fault. The ridges may have been created through a sequence of eruptions of viscous cryolava in pre-existing faults and grabens. Differences in ridge structures likely imply a multi-stage combination of cryovolcanic and tectonic evolutionary processes: an initial eruption stage along a graben constructs a narrow ridge. As eruptions continue, the ridge broadens and lengthens; continued tectonic extension can then widen the surrounding trough. Conversely, planetary scientists Paul Schenk and M. P. A. Jackson proposed in 1993 that the ridges themselves may represent a fold and thrust belt, where contraction folds the crust into numerous ridges. Slidr Sulci crosses numerous other features, including other linear ridges such as Tano Sulci. One unusual section is with the depression Kasyapa Cavus, which has a double-ring structure. The outer ring is incomplete, partially erased by Slidr Sulci, whilst the inner ring is complete, overlying the ridge. That Slidr Sulci only partially covers Kasyapa Cavus implies multiple stages of formation of either structure, possibly explained by cryovolcanic eruptions from a single vent.
