= Ruach Planitia =

Walled plain on Triton

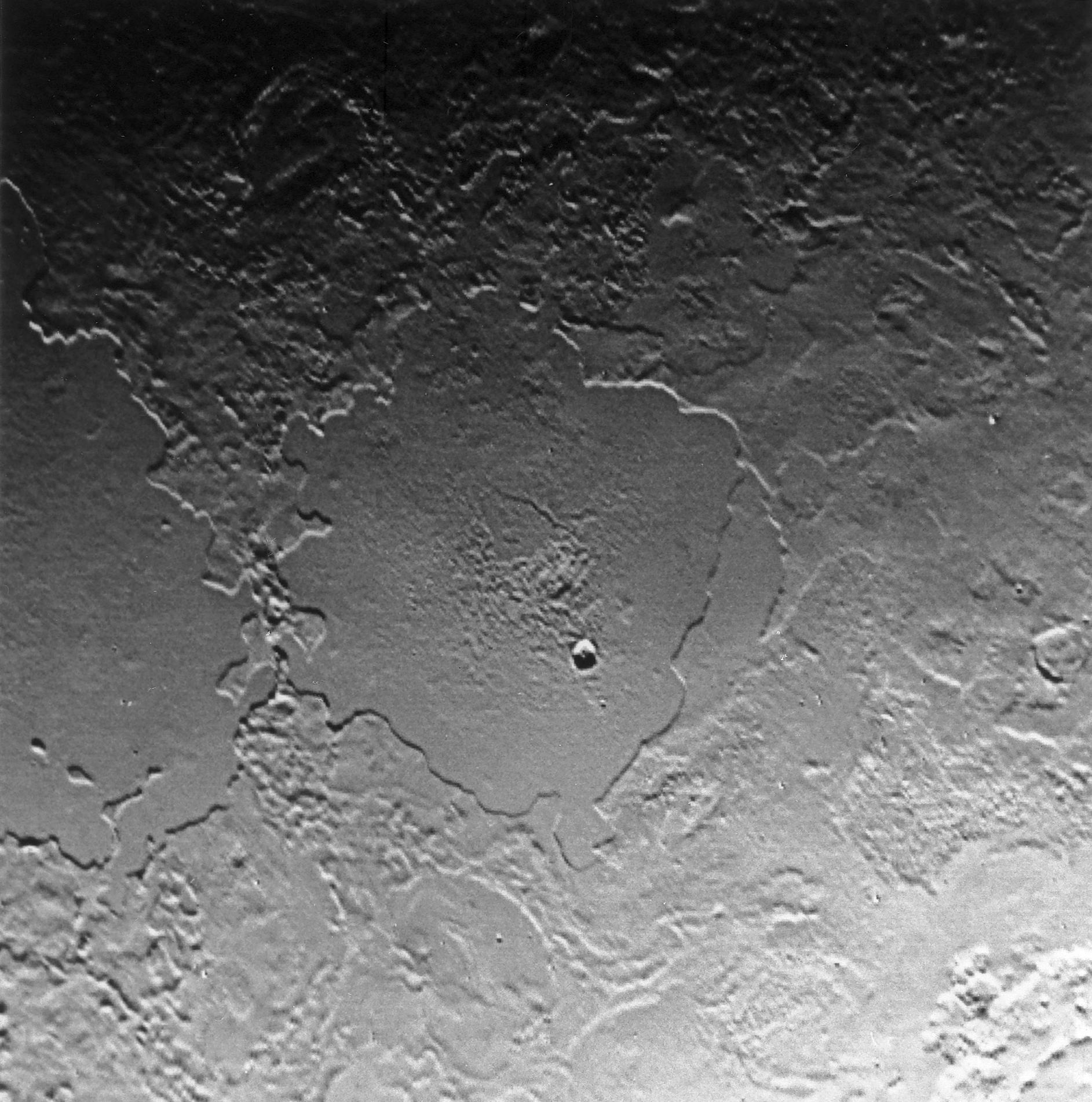
- Voyager 2 image of Ruach Planitia. The crater Amarum is located to the lower right, and Dilolo Patera occupies much of Ruach Planitia's center. Parts of Tuonela Planitia can be seen at left
- Feature type: Walled plain, cryolava lake
- Location: Monad Regio, Triton
- Coordinates: 28°00′N 24°00′E
- Diameter: ~175 km
- Depth: ~200 m
- Discoverer: Voyager 2
- Eponym: Isle of Ruach

Ruach Planitia is a roughly circular flat plain and probable cryolava lake on Neptune's moon Triton. It is located in Triton's northern hemisphere within Monad Regio and directly borders the cryovolcanic plains of Cipango Planum to the east and Tuonela Planitia to the west. Ruach Planitia, along with the other three walled plains of Triton, is one of the youngest and flattest features observed on the moon.

== Discovery and naming ==
Ruach Planitia was discovered alongside Triton's other surface features by the Voyager 2 spacecraft during its flyby of the Neptune system on 25 August 1989. The name Ruach Planitia was approved by the International Astronomical Union (IAU) in 1991; it is named after the legendary French isle of Ruach.

== Geology ==
Ruach Planitia is quasi-circular in shape and some 175–180 km in diameter. The floor of Ruach Planitia is depressed by about 200 meters relative to the surrounding plains, with the floor surrounded by bounding scarp that ranges in height between 40 and 250 meters. Most of Ruach Planitia is surrounded by a single bounding scarp, but on its east side the scarp appears to separate into two, giving a terraced profile. The floor of Ruach Planitia is generally flat, but may be subtly warped; given the limitations of Voyager 2 elevation data in the region, whether or not these are artifacts or true elevation features is uncertain. The central region of Ruach Planitia is significantly more varied in topography compared to much of Ruach Planitia's floor, with a large central pit—Dilolo Patera—nearly 10 km wide and roughly 350 m deep. Dilolo Patera is surrounded by a network of smaller pits, linear troughs, and scarps. The pit cluster at Ruach Planitia is similar to the pit clusters found within the other three walled plains of Triton, with only a single pit cluster with the largest pit at the center of the plains. Both Ruach Planitia and nearby Tuonela Planitia cut into the surrounding cantaloupe terrain, and Ruach Planitia cuts into the western regions of Cipango Planum.

Ruach Planitia's terraced appearance resembles that of terrestrial volcanic calderas, albeit at a very large scale. As with terrestrial calderas, eruptions from Ruach Planitia may have involved several distinct stages, with an early explosive stage of high-viscosity or high-volatility cryolava, a term for erupted water-dominated material analogous to silicate lava. These early eruptions form the terraced walls, with a later effusive stage that forms the flat floor. However, the crenulated appearance of the walls of Ruach Planitia do not appear to indicate collapse, and instead resemble eroded shorelines found on Earth. The multiple terraces on Ruach Planitia's eastern side may have arisen from compositional differences in different layers of Triton's crust, with some layers being more volatile than others. The flat floor of Ruach Planitia suggests that fluid cryolava infilled the depression, with the pits around Dilolo Patera acting as central vents whence material erupted from.

The terrain surrounding Ruach Planitia appears to be significantly modified, with apparent glaciation. The cliffs of both Ruach Planitia and Tuonela Planitia appear to have been significantly eroded, with the north wall of Ruach Planitia apparently having been breached in at least three sites. The breach connects to an apparent channel system that stretches for at least ~230 km, though it extended beyond Triton's terminator and into the unimaged regions of Triton's night side at the time of Voyager 2's visit. It remains uncertain on which direction fluids may have flown within the channel, though tentative deposit features on the north floor of Ruach Planitia may indicate that material flowed into the plains, depositing eroded material onto the floor. Several smaller subcircular depressions are located nearby Ruach Planitia to the south and southwest; these subcircular depressions may be of cryovolcanic origin or from diapirism.
