= Yamor Mons =

Large mountain on Ceres

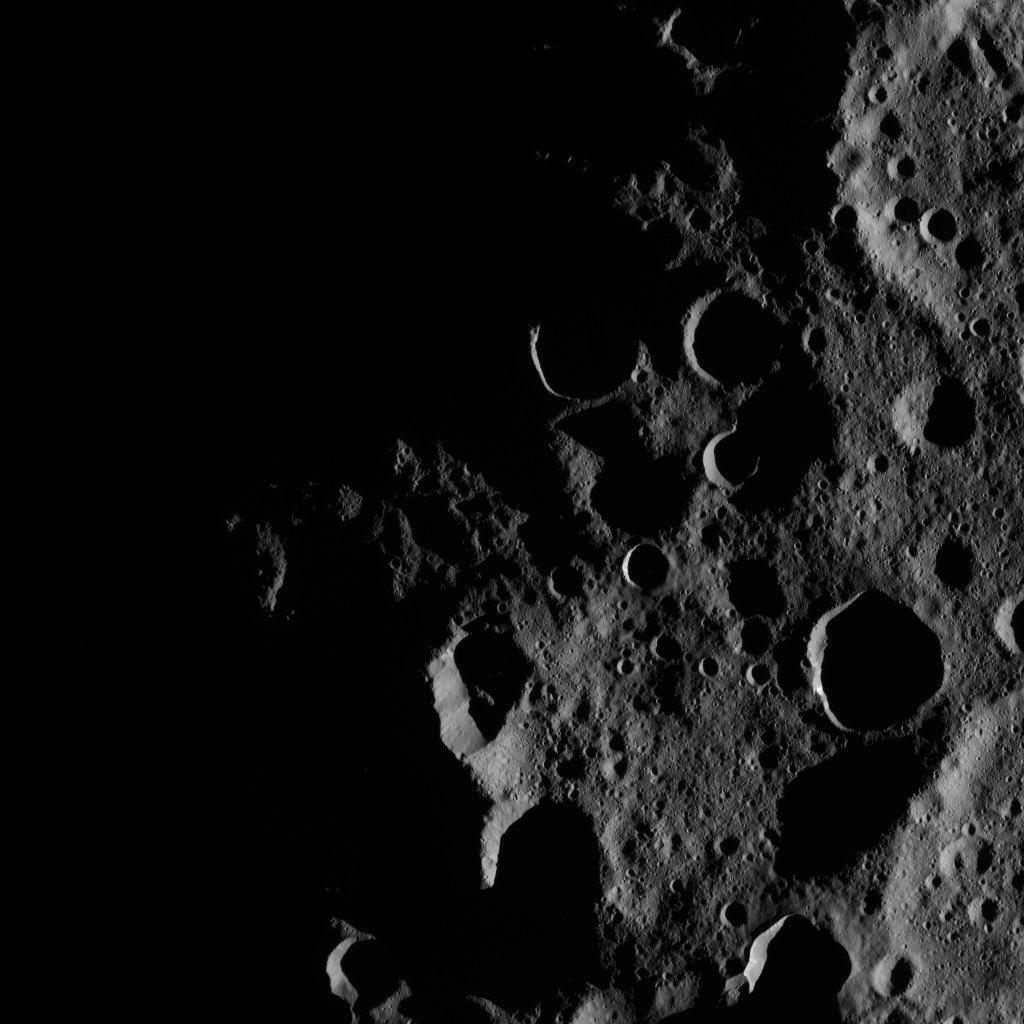
- Yamor Mons at the terminator, imaged by the Dawn spacecraft. (Note: Yamor Mons is slightly below center.)
- Feature type: Mountain, possible cryovolcano
- Location: Ceres
- Coordinates: 85.50°N 12.00°E
- Width: 20 × 15 km
- Peak: 9.5 km 4.5 km (prominence)
- Discoverer: Dawn spacecraft team 2015
- Eponym: Yamor, Ecuadorian maize festival

Yamor Mons, formerly Ysolo Mons, is a mountain on Ceres, a dwarf planet and the largest asteroid. Located near the north pole of Ceres, it is a roughly triangular mountain standing roughly 4.5 kilometres (2.8 mi) above the surrounding cratered terrain. Its shape has been battered by asteroid impacts, with some of its steep flanks carved out by nearby impact craters. It may be cryovolcanic in origin based on its similarities to another large Cerean mountain, Ahuna Mons. Other cryovolcanoes on Ceres are thought to have viscously relaxed and flattened out over time, but Yamor Mons escaped this fate due to its location in the colder north polar region.

== Observation and naming ==
On 5 March 2015, NASA's Dawn spacecraft arrived at the dwarf planet Ceres, observing and mapping its surface features in detail for the first time. Yamor Mons was first given the name Ysolo Mons on 21 September 2015 by the International Astronomical Union (IAU). Features on Ceres other than craters are named after agricultural festivals. Ysolo was reported as the name of an Albanian eggplant festival celebrating the first day of the eggplant harvest in Tirana by a blog post published on 26 November 2013 that was cited by the United States Geological Survey's Gazetteer of Planetary Nomenclature (GPN). No such festival appeared to exist, and the IAU's Working Group for Planetary System Nomenclature (WGPSN) announced the approval of the name Yamor Mons to replace Ysolo Mons on 7 December 2016. The new name comes from the Ecuadorian Yamor festival, a maize festival held in September.

== Geological characteristics ==
Yamor Mons is located in Ceres's north polar region at 85.5°N, 12.00°E, near its north pole. It rises 9.5 kilometres (5.9 mi) above Ceres's mean ellipsoid, though its topographic prominence is 4.5 kilometres (2.8 mi) relative to surrounding terrain. Its base is triangular in shape, spanning 25 by 15 kilometres (15.5 mi × 9.3 mi). Its summit is marked by a 4 kilometres (2.5 mi) long ridge oriented northwest–southeast, with a relatively flat 1 kilometre (0.62 mi) wide slope to the west of this ridge. It has four main walls steeply inclined at 20–40° and oriented to roughly mark the northeast, east, south, and northwest flanks. All main flanks are concave upward. The northeastern wall's steepness is relatively consistent at 35–40°; it is Yamor's highest flank. The eastern wall has a slope of roughly 30°, decreasing slightly towards the summit. The southern wall is split into two distinct sections: an eastern section with a consistent 24° slope, and a western section with a concave downward slope. The northwestern wall is the least steep, with a maximum slope of around 20°.

Yamor Mons's profile is affected by three impact craters. The smallest crater is about 8 kilometres (5.0 mi) in diameter, carving out a portion of the mountain's western flank. A larger 18 kilometres (11 mi) crater grazes the mountain's southeastern flank, creating a minor arcuate wall as a part of its northwestern crater rim. The third crater, 13 kilometres (8.1 mi) in size, is located to the north of the mountain. It appears to have excavated a large portion of the mountain, and its southern crater wall extends all the way to the summit rather than following a typical circular rim. The corresponding northeastern flank is the steepest of Yamor's flanks.

=== Possible cryovolcanism ===
A 2018 study of Ceres's dome-shaped hills and mountain, led by planetary scientist Michael Sori, investigated whether any of the selected features—which included Yamor Mons—could be cryovolcanic domes. A large mountain, Ahuna Mons, had previously been identified as a likely cryovolcano that formed up to 240 million years (Myr) ago. (Note: The upper limit of Ahuna Mons's age was derived through crater counting. The reliability of these age estimates is poor due to the small size of Ahuna Mons. Estimates for Yamor Mons's age are poor for similar reasons.) However, its solitary nature was unusual, as other cryovolcanic domes should have been present if Ceres was active throughout its history. Sori's team hypothesized in 2017 that viscous relaxation may explain the lack of other cryovolcanic features, as over time they would flatten out and become less distinct. The team evaluated that Yamor Mons's characteristics are consistent with a cryovolcanic origin. Its aspect ratio (width/height ratio) is comparable to that of Ahuna Mons's, likely due to its location in the colder polar regions preventing its relaxation.
