= Tuonela Planitia =

Walled plain on Triton

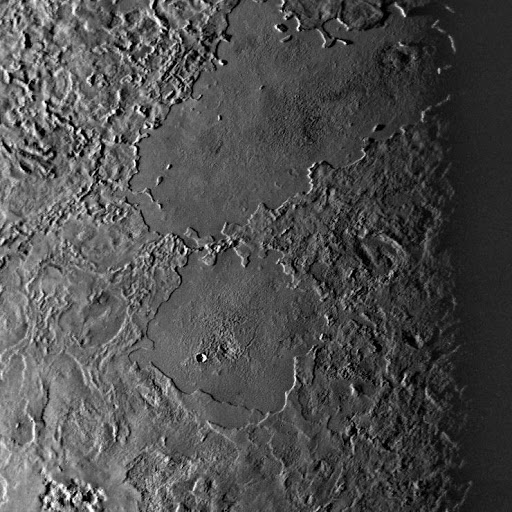
- Voyager 2 image of Tuonela Planitia across the upper half, with Ruach Planitia below. Several "islands" occupy Tuonela Planitia's interior, with Kasu Patera at the upper right
- Feature type: Walled plain, cryolava lake
- Location: Monad Regio, Triton
- Coordinates: 34°00′N 14°30′E
- Depth: ~200 m
- Dimensions: ~400 × 150 km
- Discoverer: Voyager 2
- Eponym: Tuonela

Tuonela Planitia is an elongated plain and probable cryolava lake on Neptune's moon Triton. Located in Triton's northern hemisphere within Monad Regio, it overlies part of Triton's unusual cantaloupe terrain. As with neighboring Ruach Planitia and the other walled plains on Triton, Tuonela Planitia is among the youngest features on Triton's surface.

== Discovery and naming ==
Tuonela Planitia was discovered alongside Triton's other surface features by the Voyager 2 spacecraft during its flyby of the Neptune system on 25 August 1989. The name Tuonela Planitia was approved by the International Astronomical Union (IAU) in 1991; the name originates from the underworld realm of the dead from Finnish mythology.

== Geology ==
Of the four observed major walled plains on the surface of Triton, Tuonela Planitia is by far the largest. In contrast to neighboring Ruach Planitia, which is roughly circular in shape, Tuonela Planitia is significantly elongated. Its longest axis of roughly 400 km is nearly thrice longer than its short axis of roughly 150 km, and its longest axis is aligned roughly north to south. Tuonela Planitia's alignment may be tectonically controlled, although north–south trending tectonic features are usually found closer to Triton's equator. Its floor is broadly flat, though its surface may be slightly warped; the low quality of Voyaer 2 elevation data in the region makes it uncertain as to whether or not the warping is a real topographical feature or an artifact. The depressed floor of Tuonela Planitia is bound by a single scarp with a crenulated profile; the scarp appears to superficially resemble coastlines on Earth, with alcoves, bay-like features, and numerous "islands" rising 100–250 meters above the floor of Tuonela Planitia. As with Ruach Planitia and the two other major walled plains of Triton, Tuonela Planitia hosts an unusual cluster of pits within its flat plains, though the pits of Tuonela Planitia are located within its northern "lobe". The largest pit in Tuonela Planitia has a low dome centered within it, rising some 200 meters above its surrounding moat. Tuonela Planitia cuts into the older cantaloupe terrain, indicating that it (along with other walled plains) is one of the youngest features on Triton's surface.

Like Ruach Planitia, it has been hypothesized that Tuonela Planitia represents a massive basin infilled with cryolava, water-dominated erupted material analogous to silicate-dominated lava. The pit clusters within the walled plains like Tuonela Planitia have been compared to volcanic vents or drainage pits, and they may represent sites whence material erupted from. As with terrestrial calderas on Earth, the eruptive history of Tuonela Planitia may have occurred in multiple stages, with an early stage of explosive eruptions involving high-viscosity or high-volatility material that clears a caldera, later transitioning into a stage of effusive eruption that fills the basin with cryolava. The shoreline-like profile of Tuonela Planitia's walls indicate that they may have been eroded by fluid sitting within the basins for extended periods of time, and the surrounding smooth terrain may represent sites of viscous cryolava flows or cryoclastic deposits. However, Tuonela Planitia's walls do not appear to resemble the collapse scarps of typical calderas.

Both Tuonela Planitia and Ruach Planitia appear to have bounding scarps that were subsequently modified by erosive processes, carving channels and valleys into their faces. In particular, Tuonela Planitia's eastern wall is host to a system of short, dense, narrow channels that may have been carved by glacial activity. Other features of probable cryovolcanic origin also lie close to Tuonela Planitia, such as a number of pitted cones south of the plain. These pitted cones are roughly conical hills with central depressions, superficially resembling terrestrial and lunar cinder cones.
