= Vulcan Planitia =

Major plain on Charon

- An annotated map of Charon, with Vulcan Planitia in the southern hemisphere.
- Feature type: Plain
- Location: Charon
- Coordinates: 0°N 0°W
- Surface area: ~400 000 km^{2}
- Discoverer: New Horizons

Vulcan Planitia, /ˈvʌlkən pləˈnɪʃə/ or Vulcan Planum, is the unofficial name given to a large plain on the southern hemisphere of Pluto's moon Charon. It was discovered by New Horizons during its flyby of Pluto in July 2015. It is named after the fictional planet Vulcan in the science-fiction series Star Trek. The name is not approved by the International Astronomical Union (IAU) as of 2024.

== Geography ==
Vulcan Planitia occupies much of the southern hemisphere of Charon's encounter hemisphere, the side facing the New Horizons spacecraft at closest approach. Its extent is not completely known, but it occupies at least 400,000 km^{2} (150,000 sq mi). Vulcan Planitia is separated from Oz Terra to the north by a series of tectonic scarps that rise several kilometers high, including Serenity Chasma and Mandjet Chasma. Vulcan Planitia's southern boundary, in contrast, is poorly-constrained; the plains extend well into Charon's anti-encounter hemisphere where imagery is of poorer resolution and it becomes difficult to distinguish the plains from tectonized terrain like Oz Terra. To the east, Argo Chasma resembles the bounding scarps that line the border between Vulcan Planitia and Oz Terra, though this identification remains uncertain. To the west, an arcuate trench appears to separate Vulcan Planitia from more highlands.

Within Vulcan Planitia itself, several isolated "moated" mountains rise above the surrounding plains, surrounded by depressions. These mountains are located in the eastern plains, rising roughly 2–6 km high. The most prominent of these include Kubrick Mons, standing 2.5–3 km above the surrounding plains and 3.7–4 km above its surrounding moat; and Clarke Mons, which rises to a similar height. A large irregularly-shaped unnamed depression roughly 55 km wide and 4.5 km deep sits to the far northeastern corner of Vulcan Planitia, surrounded by rough terrain. A total of seven depressions and moated mountains are located within Vulcan Planitia.

=== List of named features within Vulcan Planitia ===
The features included in this table lie within Vulcan Planitia. The more significant craters have been named after characters from Star Trek, while two mountains have been named after science-fiction authors and directors.

Feature	Type	Named After	Mythos
Clarke Mons	Mountain	Arthur C. Clarke	Science-fiction author
Kubrick Mons	Mountain	Stanley Kubrick	Science-fiction author
Kirk	Crater	James T. Kirk	Star Trek series
Nemo	Crater	Captain Nemo	Twenty Thousand Leagues Under the Seas
Sadko	Crater	Sadko	Bylina epic
Spock	Crater	Spock	Star Trek series
Sulu	Crater	Hikaru Sulu	Star Trek series
Uhura	Crater	Nyota Uhura	Star Trek series

== Geology ==
Vulcan Planitia is dominated by three major terrains. Smooth rolling plains occupy most of Vulcan Planitia, hosting scattered pits, troughs, fractures, and several isolated mountains. To the south, a mottled terrain with rough bumps approximately hundreds of meters in scale dominate, often blending in with the rolling plains. To the far northeast, a region of rough terrain dominated by large ridges and blocks surrounds a deep depression. In contrast to Oz Terra, Vulcan Planitia is overall geologically homogenous and less cratered, displaying no major tectonic disruptions and few large impact craters. It lies roughly 1 km below the mean elevation of Oz Terra, but 2–2.5 km below the tops of Oz Terra's crustal blocks. These traits suggest that Vulcan Planitia is younger than Oz Terra, representing a large cryovolcanically resurfaced plain. Despite this, Vulcan Planitia is still ancient; the density of cratering, which supersedes most cryovolcanic and tectonic features in the region, indicates that Vulcan Planitia is at least 4 billion years old.
