= Slidr River =

Mythological river

In Norse mythology, Sliðr is a river in Hel, the land of the dead. Glaciers pour into it from the freezing well of Hvergelmir, its waters are full of knives and swords, and it flows through "valleys of venom", according to the Eddas.
