= Tidal heating =

Orbital and friction heating on a planet or moon oceans, or interior

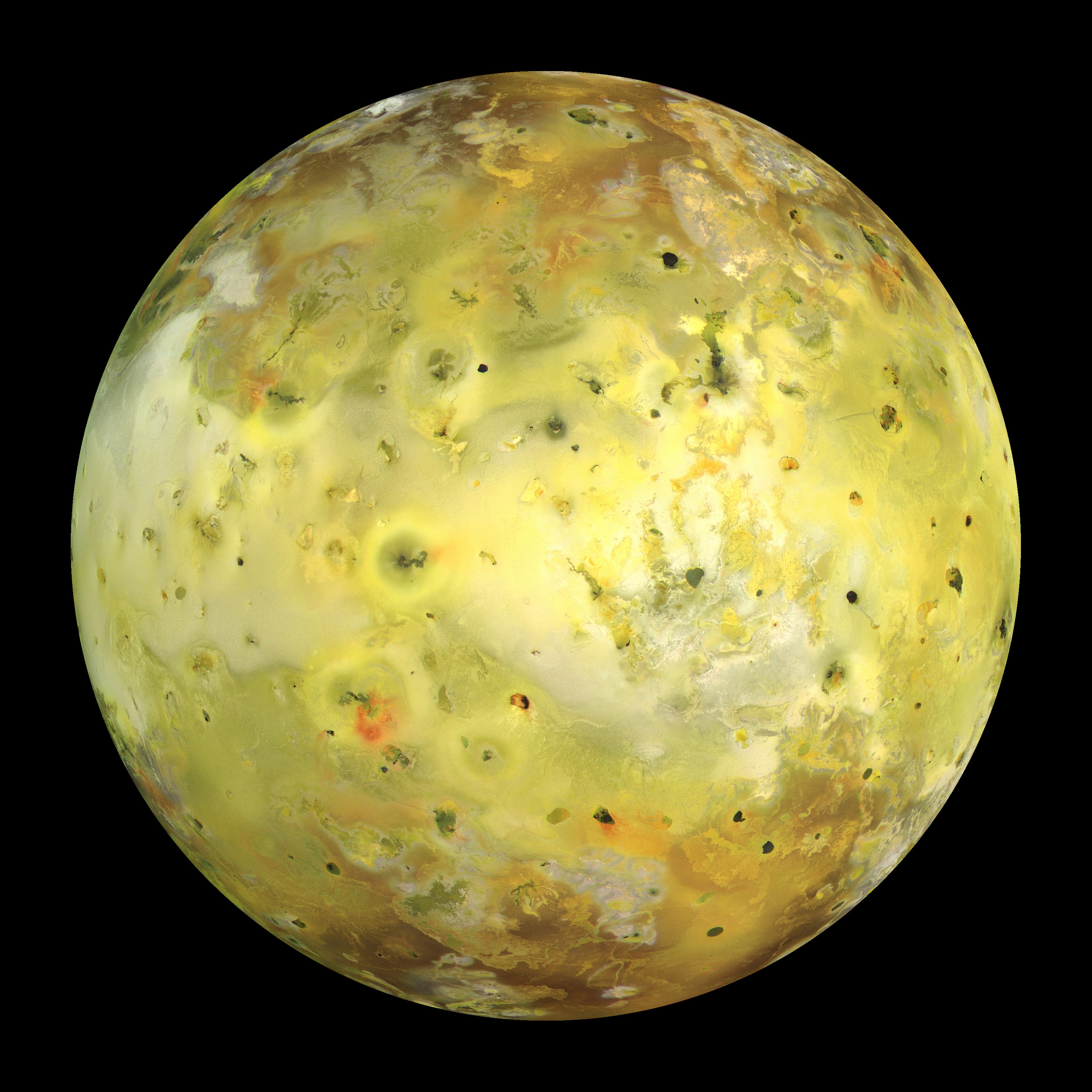
Io, closest major moon of Jupiter, experiences intense tidal heating due to gravitational pulls from the largest planet in the solar system, and the neighboring large moons, causing it to be the most volcanically active object in the entire solar system.

Tidal heating (also known as tidal dissipation or tidal damping) occurs through the tidal friction processes: orbital and rotational energy is dissipated as heat in either (or both) the surface ocean or interior of a planet or satellite. When an object is in an elliptical orbit, the tidal forces acting on it are stronger near periapsis than near apoapsis. Thus the deformation of the body due to tidal forces (i.e. the tidal bulge) varies over the course of its orbit, generating internal friction which heats its interior. This energy gained by the object comes from its orbital energy and/or rotational energy, so over time in a two-body system, the initial elliptical orbit decays into a circular orbit (tidal circularization) and the rotational periods of the two bodies adjust towards matching the orbital period (tidal locking). Sustained tidal heating occurs when the elliptical orbit is prevented from circularizing due to additional gravitational forces from other bodies that keep tugging the object back into an elliptical orbit. In this more complex system, orbital and rotational energy still is being converted to thermal energy; however, now the orbit's semimajor axis would shrink rather than its eccentricity.

== Moons of giant planets ==
Tidal heating is responsible for the geologic activity of the most volcanically active body in the Solar System: Io, a moon of Jupiter. Io's eccentricity persists as the result of its orbital resonances with the Galilean moons Europa and Ganymede. The same mechanism has provided the energy to melt the lower layers of the ice surrounding the rocky mantle of Jupiter's next-closest large moon, Europa. However, the heating of the latter is weaker, because of reduced flexing—Europa has half Io's orbital frequency and a 14% smaller radius; also, while Europa's orbit is about twice as eccentric as Io's, tidal force falls off with the cube of distance and is only a quarter as strong at Europa. Jupiter maintains the moons' orbits via tides they raise on it and thus its rotational energy ultimately powers the system. Saturn's moon Enceladus is similarly thought to have a liquid water ocean beneath its icy crust, due to tidal heating related to its resonance with Dione. The water vapor geysers which eject material from Enceladus are thought to be powered by friction generated within its interior.

== Earth ==
Munk & Wunsch (1998) estimated that Earth experiences 3.7 TW (0.0073 W/m^{2}) of tidal heating, of which 95% (3.5 TW or 0.0069 W/m^{2}) is associated with ocean tides and 5% (0.2 TW or 0.0004 W/m^{2}) is associated with Earth tides, with 3.2 TW being due to tidal interactions with the Moon and 0.5 TW being due to tidal interactions with the Sun. Egbert & Ray (2001) confirmed that overall estimate, writing "the total amount of tidal energy dissipated in the Earth-Moon-Sun system is now well-determined. The methods of space geodesy—altimetry, satellite laser ranging, lunar laser ranging—have converged to 3.7 TW ..."

Heller et al. (2021) estimated that shortly after the Moon was formed, when the Moon orbited 10-15 times closer to Earth than it does now, tidal heating might have contributed ~10 W/m^{2} of heating. This heating happened over perhaps 100 million years, and could have accounted for a temperature increase of up to 5°C on the early Earth.

== Moon ==
Harada et al. (2014) proposed that tidal heating may have created a molten layer at the core-mantle boundary within Earth's Moon.

== Formula ==
The tidal heating rate, $\dot{E}_\text{Tidal}$, in a satellite that is spin-synchronous, coplanar ($I=0$), and has an eccentric orbit is given by:
$$\dot{E}_\text{Tidal} = -\operatorname{Im}(k_2)\frac{21}{2} \frac{G M_h^2 R^5 n e^2}{a^6}$$
where $R$, $n$, $a$, and $e$ are respectively the satellite's mean radius, mean orbital motion, orbital distance, and eccentricity. $M_{h}$ is the host (or central) body's mass and $\operatorname{Im}(k_{2})$ represents the imaginary portion of the second-order Love Number which measures the efficiency at which the satellite dissipates tidal energy into frictional heat. This imaginary portion is defined by interplay of the body's rheology and self-gravitation. It, therefore, is a function of the body's radius, density, and rheological parameters (the shear modulus, viscosity, and others – dependent upon the rheological model). The rheological parameters' values, in turn, depend upon the temperature and the concentration of partial melt in the body's interior.

The tidally dissipated power in a nonsynchronised rotator is given by a more complex expression.

== See also ==
- Cryovolcano
- Tidal acceleration
- Tidal locking
- Io Volcano Observer
- Planetary differentiation
