= Timeline of New Horizons =

Scientific mission history

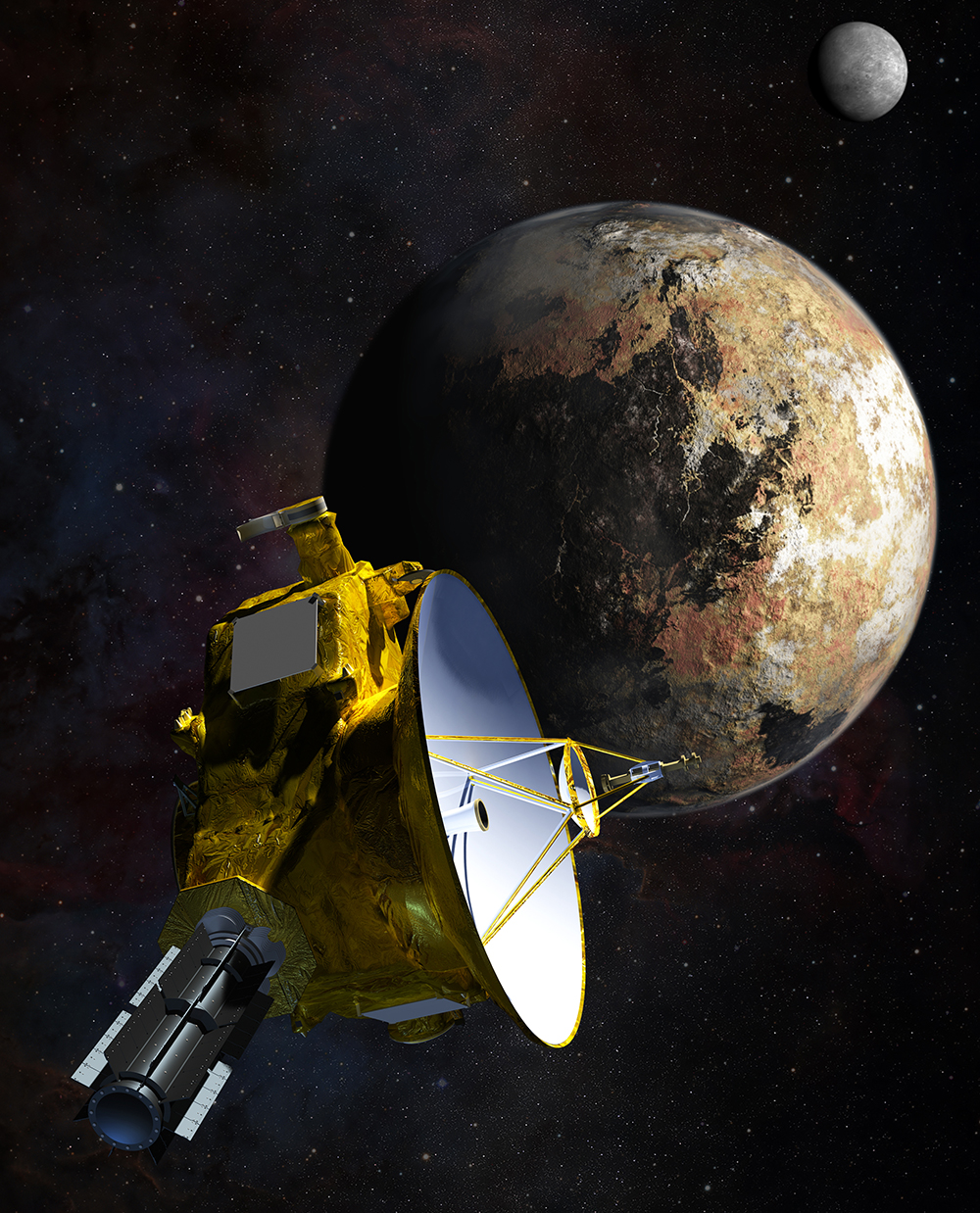
An artist's impression of New Horizons' close encounter with the Plutonian system

Timeline for the New Horizons interplanetary space probe lists the significant events of the launch, transition phases as well as subsequent significant operational mission events; by date and brief description.

== Preparation phase ==
- January 8, 2001: Proposal team meets face-to-face for the first time at the Johns Hopkins University Applied Physics Laboratory.
- February 5, 2001: New Horizons name chosen.
- April 6, 2001: New Horizons proposal submitted to NASA. It was one of five proposals submitted, which were later narrowed to two for Phase A study: POSSE (Pluto and Outer Solar System Explorer) and New Horizons.
- November 29, 2001: New Horizons proposal selected by NASA. Started Phase B study.
- March 2002: Budget zeroed by Bush administration, later overridden.
- June 13, 2005: Spacecraft departed Applied Physics Laboratory for final testing. It undergoes final testing at Goddard Space Flight Center (GSFC).
- September 24, 2005: Spacecraft shipped to Cape Canaveral. It was moved through Andrews Air Force Base aboard a C-17 Globemaster III cargo aircraft.
- December 17, 2005: Spacecraft ready for in rocket positioning. Transported from Hazardous Servicing Facility to Vertical Integration Facility at Space Launch Complex 41.
- January 11, 2006: Primary launch window opened. The launch was delayed for further testing.
- January 16, 2006: Rocket moved onto launch pad. Atlas V launcher, serial number AV-010, rolled out onto pad.
- January 17, 2006: Launch delayed. First day launch attempts scrubbed because of unacceptable weather conditions (high winds).
- January 18, 2006: Launch delayed again. Second launch attempt scrubbed because of morning power outage at the Applied Physics Laboratory.

== Launch phase ==
- January 19, 2006: Successful launch at 19:00 UTC after a brief delay due to cloud cover.

== Jupiter pre-encounter phase ==
- April 7, 2006: The probe passed Mars' orbit 1.5 AU from Earth.
- June 13, 2006: Flyby of asteroid 132524 APL. The probe passed closest to the asteroid 132524 APL in the Asteroid Belt at about 101,867 km at 04:05 UTC. Pictures were taken.
- November 28, 2006: First image of Pluto. The image of Pluto was taken from a great distance.

== Jupiter encounter phase ==
- January 10, 2007: Navigation exercise near Jupiter. Long-distance observations of Jupiter's outer moon Callirrhoe as a navigation exercise.
- February 28, 2007: Jupiter flyby. Closest approach occurred at 05:43:40 UTC at 2.305 million km, 21.219 km/s.

== Pluto pre-encounter phase ==
- June 8, 2008: The probe passed Saturn's orbit 9.5 AU from Earth.
- December 29, 2009: The probe becomes closer to Pluto than to Earth. Pluto was then 32.7 AU from Earth, and the probe was 16.4 AU from Earth.
- February 25, 2010: New Horizons completed 2.38 billion km (1.48 billion mi), half the total travel distance of 4.76 billion km (2.96 billion mi).
- March 18, 2011: The probe passes Uranus' orbit. This is the fourth planetary orbit the spacecraft crossed since its start. New Horizons reached Uranus's orbit at 22:00 UTC.
- December 2, 2011: New Horizons draws closer to Pluto than any other spacecraft has ever been. Previously, Voyager 1 held the record for the closest approach. (~10.58 AU)
- February 11, 2012: New Horizons reaches the distance of 10 AU from the Pluto system, at around 4:55 UTC.
- July 1, 2013: New Horizons captures its first image of Charon. Charon is clearly separated from Pluto using the Long-Range Reconnaissance Imager (LORRI).
- October 25, 2013: New Horizons reaches the distance of 5 AU from the Pluto system.
- July 10, 2014: Photos of Neptune and Triton from about 4 billion km away.
- July 20, 2014: Photos of Pluto and Charon. Images obtained showing both bodies orbiting each other, distance 2.8 AU.
- August 25, 2014: The probe passes Neptune's orbit. This was the fifth planetary orbit crossed.
- December 7, 2014: New Horizons awakes from hibernation. NASA's Deep Sky Network station at Tidbinbilla, Australia received a signal confirming that it successfully awoke from hibernation.
- January 2015: Observation of Kuiper belt object 2011 KW48. Distant observations from a distance of roughly 75 million km (~0.5 AU)
- January 15, 2015: Start of Pluto observations. New Horizons is now close enough to Pluto and begins observing the system.
- March 10–11, 2015: New Horizons reaches a distance of 1 AU from the Pluto system.
- March 20, 2015: NASA invites the general public to suggest names for surface features that may be discovered on Pluto and Charon.
- May 15, 2015: Images exceed best Hubble Space Telescope resolution.

== Pluto science phase ==
- July 14, 2015: Flyby of the Pluto system: Pluto, Charon, Hydra, Nix, Kerberos and Styx.
  • Flyby of Pluto around 11:49:57 UTC at 12,500 km, 13.78 km/s.
  • Pluto is 32.9 AU from Sun.
  • Flyby of Charon around 12:03:50 UTC at 28,858 km, 13.87 km/s.
- July 14, 2015 to October 25, 2016: Transmission of collected data sent back to Earth, and ongoing science discovery based on the observations. The bit rate of the downlink is limited to 1–2 kb/s, so it took until October 25, 2016, to transmit all the data.

== Arrokoth pre-encounter phase ==
- October 22 – November 4, 2015: Trajectory correction maneuver. A course adjustment for the January 2019 flyby of KBO 486958 Arrokoth was performed in a series of four thruster firings of 22 minutes each.
- November 2, 2015: Observation of Kuiper belt object (KBO) 15810 Arawn. Long-range observations from a distance of 274 million kilometers (1.83 AU), the closest ever for any Trans-Neptunian Object other than Pluto and 486958 Arrokoth. More images were taken on April 7–8, 2016, at a range of 179 million kilometers (1.20 AU) as well.
- July 13–14, 2016: Observation of KBO 50000 Quaoar. Long-range observations from a distance of 2.1 billion kilometers (14 AU) gives mission scientists a different perspective in order to study the light-scattering properties of Quaoar's surface.
- February 1, 2017: Trajectory correction maneuver. A small course adjustment towards the January 2019 flyby of Arrokoth was performed with a 44-second thruster firing.
- March 12, 2017: Arrokoth's orbit is deemed to be sufficiently well-resolved that it is formally catalogued as minor planet #486,958 and announced as such via Minor Planet Circular 103886. From now until its naming in November 2019, the object's official designation is to be (486958) 2014 MU_{69}.
- 2017–2020: Observations of KBOs. The probe will have opportunities to perform observations of 10 to 20 KBOs visible from the spacecraft's trajectory after the Pluto system flyby. Heliosphere data collection is expected to begin.
- December 9, 2017: Trajectory correction maneuver. This delays the arrival at Arrokoth by a few hours, optimizing coverage by ground-based radio telescopes.
- December 23, 2017 – June 4, 2018: Final hibernation period before the KBO Arrokoth encounter.
- August 2018 – March 2019: Distant observations of at least a dozen distant KBOs. Recovered by Subaru Telescope in 2014–2017, enabling New Horizons observations
- August 13, 2018: Switch from spin stabilization to 3-axis stabilization.
- August 16, 2018 – December 24, 2018: Approach phase. Optical navigation, search for hazardous material around Arrokoth
- August 16, 2018: First detection of Kuiper belt object Arrokoth
- October 4, 2018 – December 2, 2018: Opportunities for trajectory correction maneuvers. Maneuvers scheduled for October 4 and November 20, with backups on October 23 and December 2, respectively

== Arrokoth science phase and beyond ==
- January 1, 2019: Flyby of Arrokoth, then nicknamed Ultima Thule. The flyby occurred at 05:33 UTC, and is the outermost close encounter of any Solar System object.
- January 9, 2019: Switch from 3-axis stabilization to spin stabilization. This ended the Arrokoth flyby, marking the beginning of the downlink phase.
- 2019–2020: Downlink of data from the Arrokoth flyby. Predicted to take approximately 20 months.
- November 12, 2019: The object previously known by the provisional designation of 2014 MU_{69} (later numbered 486958 and nicknamed Ultima Thule) was officially named Arrokoth.
- April 22–23, 2020: Stellar distance measurements to both Proxima Centauri, and Wolf 359 using stereoscopic images from New Horizons and Earth-based telescopes for usable parallax observation.
- April 15, 2021: New Horizons reaches 50 AU from the Sun, becoming the fifth spacecraft to reach the milestone.
- April 30, 2021: End of the first extended mission.
- May 26, 2022: "NASA’s New Horizons mission’s second extended mission proposal was approved." This two-year mission "will make distant observations of Uranus and Neptune[,] map the very faint 'cosmic background' in visible and ultraviolet (UV) light [and use] its instruments to understand the motions of charged particles as they interact with the solar wind, and to understand our heliosphere's large-scale structure."
- 2020s: The probe may be able to fly by a third Kuiper Belt Object (KBO). The probe approached Arrokoth along its rotational axis, which simplified trajectory correction maneuvers, saving fuel that could be used to target another KBO. After the flyby, the spacecraft was left with 11 kg (24 lb) of fuel.
- Mid to late 2030s: Expected end of the mission, based on RTG decay. Heliosphere data collection expected to be intermittent if instrument power sharing is required.

== Post-mission phase ==
- 2038: New Horizons will be 100 AU from the Sun. If still functioning, the probe will explore the outer heliosphere and interstellar space along with the Voyager spacecraft.
