= List of New Horizons topics =

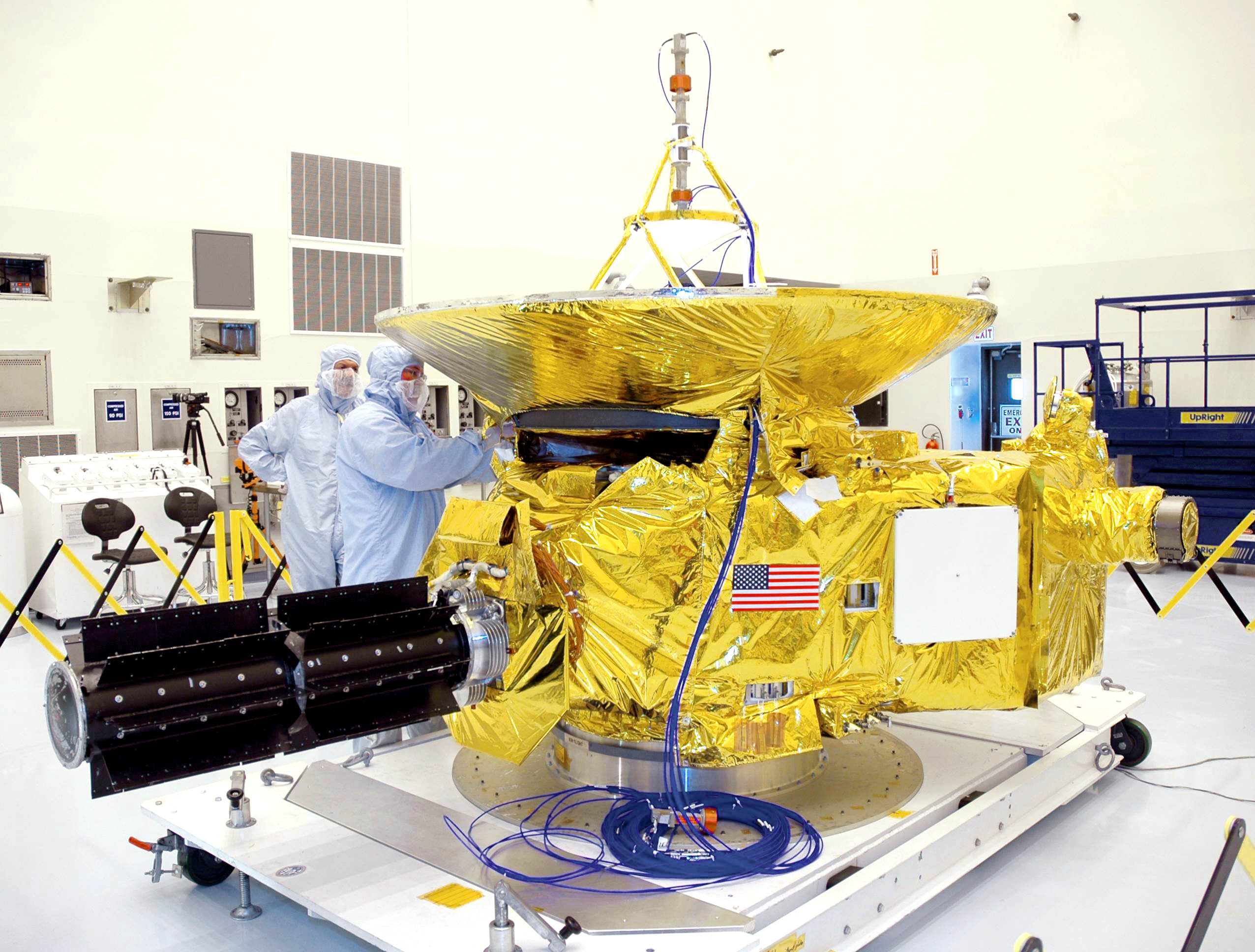
New Horizons at Kennedy Space Center in 2005

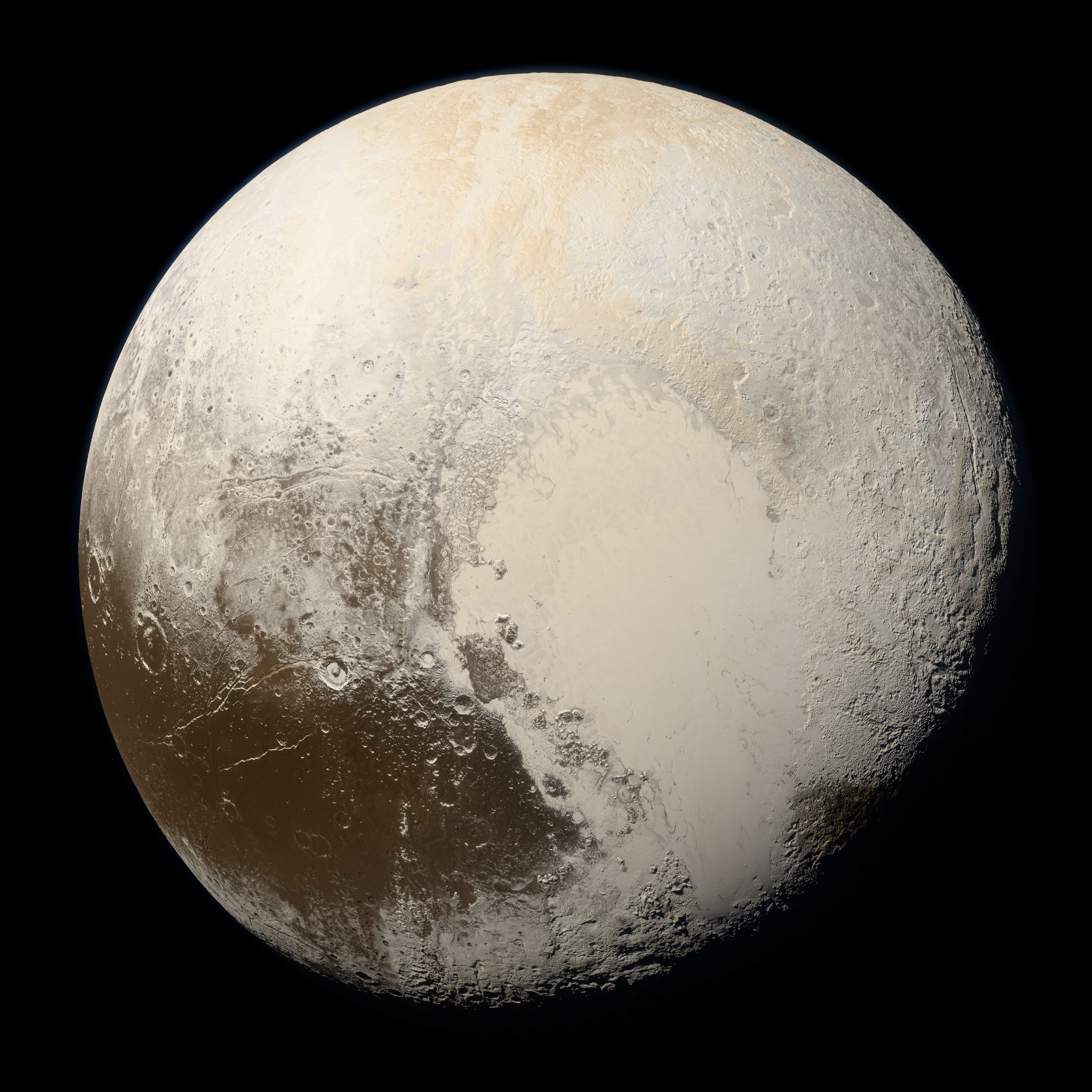
Pluto by New Horizons

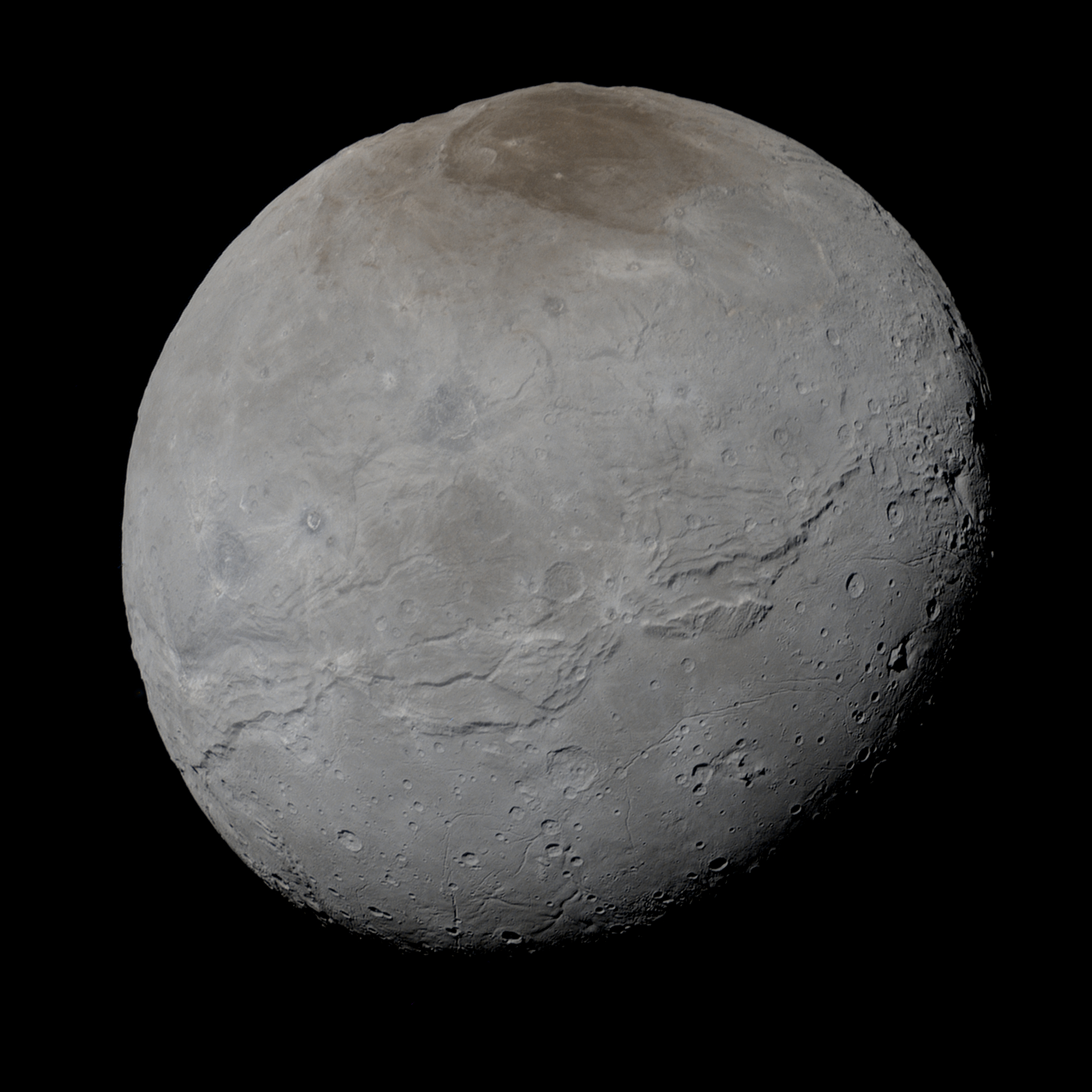
Charon by New Horizons

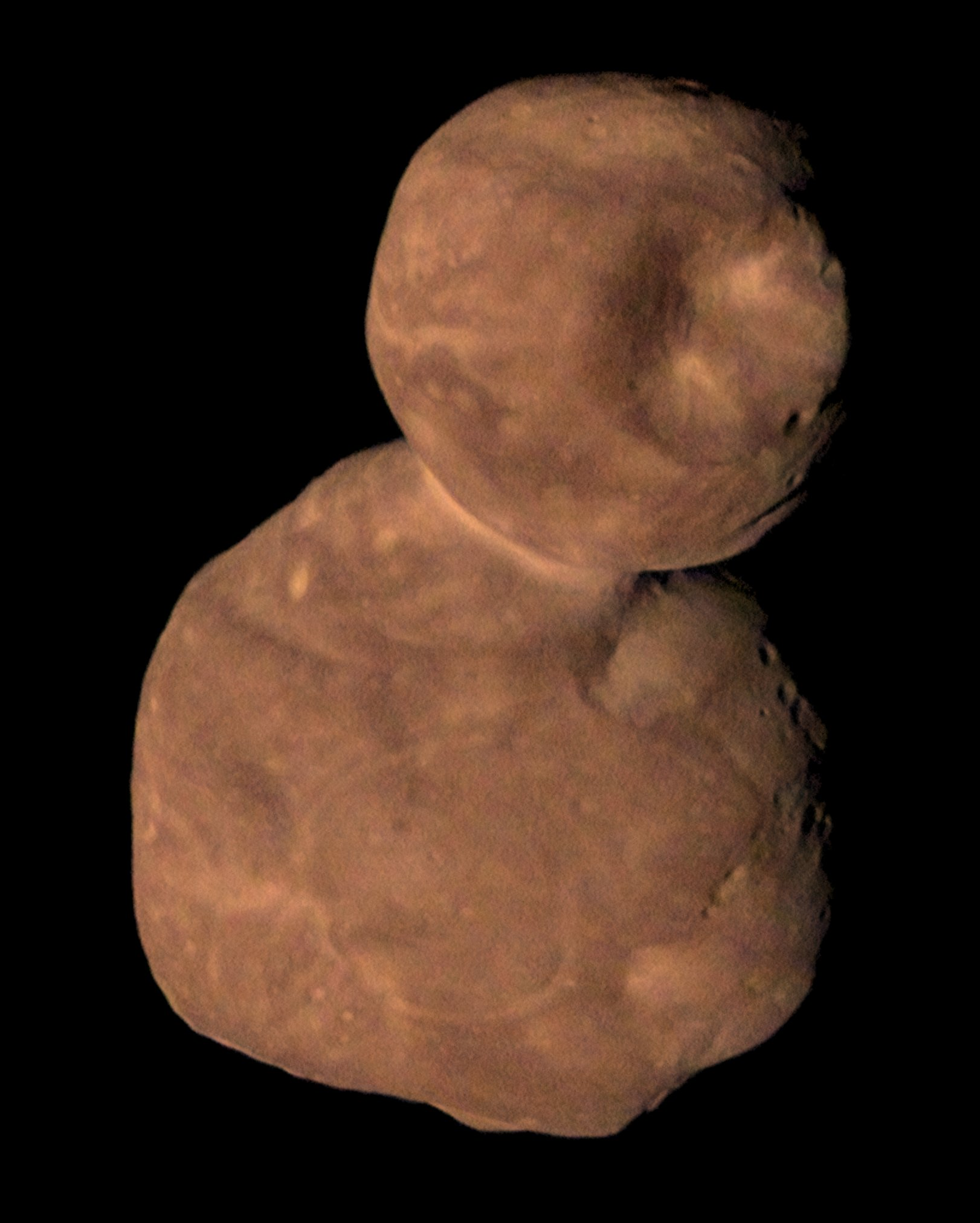
486958 Arrokoth by New Horizons

List of New Horizons topics is a list of topics related to the New Horizons spacecraft, an unmanned space probe launched 2006 to Pluto and beyond.

On January 19, 2006, it was launched directly into a solar-escape trajectory at 16.26 kilometers per second (58,536 km/h; 36,373 mph) from Cape Canaveral using an Atlas V version with 5 SRBs and Star 48B thirdstage . New Horizons passed the Moon's orbit in just nine hours.

- 132524 APL, Distant observation target
- 15810 Arawn (1994 JR1), Distant observation target
- 2011 HM102, Neptune Trojan considered as an observation target
- 2011 KW48, distant observation target
- 2014 MT69, former candidate for New Horizons flyby.
- 2014 OS393, former potential flyby target
- 2014 PN70, former potential flyby target
- 486958 Arrokoth, flyby on New Year's Day 2019
- Alice (spacecraft instrument), one of seven major instruments on New Horizons
- Alice Bowman, New Horizons staff
- AJ-60A, solid rocket booster of which five were used in the New Horizons launch.
- Atlas V, New Horizons launch vehicle
- Cape Canaveral Air Force Station Space Launch Complex 41, launch site
- Centaur (rocket stage), New Horizons upper stage
- Charon (moon), Pluto's big moon
- Common Core Booster, part of New Horizons first stage launcher
- Clyde Tombaugh, discovered Pluto in 1930 from Lowell Observatory
- Kirk (crater)
- Kuiper belt, region from about 30-60 AU New Horizons explores
- Lisa Hardaway, New Horizons staff
- Long Range Reconnaissance Imager, one of seven major instruments on New Horizons
- GPHS-RTG, electrical and thermal heat source of New Horizons
- Interplanetary dust cloud
- Interplanetary medium, studied during Hibernation
- Mongoose-V, CPU in New Horizons
- NASA Deep Space Network, for New Horizons Earth radio communications
- Nasreddin (crater)
- New Frontiers program, NASA parent program of New Horizons
- New Horizons 2, design study for twin
- Organa (crater)
- Pluto, primary target of New Horizons
- Pluto Energetic Particle Spectrometer Science Investigation, one of seven major instruments on New Horizons
- Ralph, one of seven major instruments on New Horizons
- REX, one of seven major instruments on New Horizons
- Daniel Sarokon, NASA employee honored at New Horizons launch
- Star 48B, New Horizons 3rd stage
- Alan Stern, New Horizons staff
- SWAP, one of seven major instruments on New Horizons
- Tvashtar Paterae
- Vader (crater), crater observed by New Horizons
- Venetia Burney Student Dust Counter, one of seven major instruments on New Horizons
- Venetia Burney, New Horizons instrument honorific, Burney proposed Pluto's name in 1930

== See also ==
- Exploration of Pluto
- List of artificial objects leaving the Solar System
- List of trans-Neptunian objects
