= 132524 APL =

Asteroid visited by New Horizons

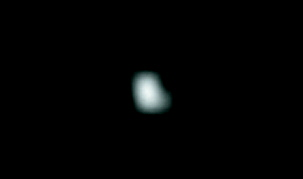
- APL seen by New Horizons from 1.3 million kilometers in June 2006

Discovery
- Discovered by: LINEAR
- Discovery site: Lincoln Lab ETS
- Discovery date: 9 May 2002

Designations
- Named after: Applied Physics Laboratory
- Alternative designations: 2002 JF_{56}
- Minor planet category: main-belt · (middle) background

Orbital characteristics
- Epoch 27 April 2019 (JD 2458600.5)
- Uncertainty parameter 0
- Observation arc: 27.41 yr (10,012 d)
- Aphelion: 3.3163 AU
- Perihelion: 1.8904 AU
- Semi-major axis: 2.6033 AU
- Eccentricity: 0.2738
- Orbital period (sidereal): 4.20 yr (1,534 d)
- Mean anomaly: 320.13°
- Mean motion: 0° 14^{m} 4.56^{s} / day
- Inclination: 4.1585°
- Longitude of ascending node: 51.698°
- Argument of perihelion: 261.87°

Physical characteristics
- Mean diameter: 2.5 km
- Spectral type: S
- Absolute magnitude (H): 15.3

132524 APL (provisional designation 2002 JF_{56}) is a small background asteroid in the intermediate asteroid belt. It was discovered by Lincoln Near-Earth Asteroid Research in May 2002, and imaged by the New Horizons space probe on its flyby in June 2006, when it was passing through the asteroid belt. The stony S-type asteroid measures approximately 2.5 kilometers (1.6 miles) in diameter.

== Discovery and classification ==
APL was discovered on 9 May 2002 by astronomers of the Lincoln Near-Earth Asteroid Research at the Lincoln Laboratory Experimental Test Site near Socorro, New Mexico, United States. It is a non-family asteroid from the main belt's background population, and orbits the Sun in the central asteroid belt at a distance of 1.9–3.3 AU once every 4 years and 2 months (1,534 days; semi-major axis of 2.6 AU). Its orbit has an eccentricity of 0.27 and an inclination of 4° with respect to the ecliptic.

== Naming ==
Alan Stern, principal investigator for New Horizons, named the asteroid in reference to the Johns Hopkins University Applied Physics Laboratory (APL), which developed the New Horizons, NEAR Shoemaker and MESSENGER missions. The official naming citation was published by the Minor Planet Center on 6 January 2007 (M.P.C. 58598).

== Exploration ==
=== New Horizons flyby ===
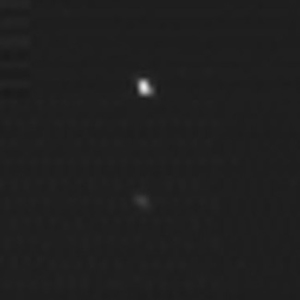
Top and bottom images of APL taken by Ralph at 1.34 and 3.36 million kilometers, respectively

Animation of New Horizons's trajectory from 19 January 2006 to 30 December 2030 Pluto · Arrokoth · Earth APL · Jupiter · New Horizons

The New Horizons probe flew by it at a distance of approximately 102,000 km (63,000 mi) on 13 June 2006. At its closest, it was about 1/4 of a lunar distance away from the asteroid. The flyby was incidental, and not all the instruments were online at this time; they were still being activated after the spacecraft's launch on January 19, 2006. This is why the spacecraft's reconnaissance imager and highest magnification telescope were not online yet at the time of the flyby.

==== Ralph instrument ====
APL was imaged with the 75-millimeter Ralph telescope, but not with the designed reconnaissance imager Long Range Reconnaissance Imager (LORRI) because it was not turned on yet. LORRI was not activated until 29 August 2006 when its cover was opened and its first light image would be Messier 7. It was, in general, possible to capitalize on the target of opportunity, and the asteroid was tracked for several days in June 2006 in addition to the other tests. In March, New Horizons had passed the orbit of Mars, and the spacecraft was undergoing various course correction maneuvers and tests throughout this time; as mentioned LORRI was not activated for another couple months. New Horizons passed through the asteroid belt during the summer of 2006, and the test helped prepare the team and spacecraft for the future flybys of Jupiter and Pluto. The asteroid belt is a feature of the Solar System, consisting of a large number asteroids that orbit the Sun primarily between 2.2 and 3.2 AU (Earth-Sun distance) which is between the orbits of planets Mars and Jupiter.

==== Traversing the asteroid belt ====
Crossing the asteroid belt is possible, because although there are over a million asteroids larger than 1 km in diameter, the distance between them is so large spacecraft pass through empty space. This was established in the early 1970s when Pioneer 10 and Pioneer 11 traversed the belt for the first time. There is some increased probability of encountering dust, but otherwise it takes special planning to actually pass very close to an asteroid, as was done with Galileo. In the 1990s, when it passed through the belt on its way to its second Earth gravity assist, it flew by 951 Gaspra; after the flyby en route to Jupiter, it flew by 243 Ida and discovered its moon Dactyl.

== Physical characteristics ==
Prior and in support of the New Horizons fly by on 13 June 2006, astronomers at European Southern Observatory's Paranal Observatory were observing APL with one of the four 8.2-meter Very Large Telescopes (UT1, Antu) between 25 May and 2 June 2006. The astronomers found that APL has a spectral type of a common, stony S-type asteroid. Using the Ralph instrument, New Horizons was later able to estimate a diameter of approximately 2.5 kilometers (1.6 miles) for the asteroid.

== See also ==
- List of New Horizons topics
