= Hydra (moon) =

Moon of Pluto

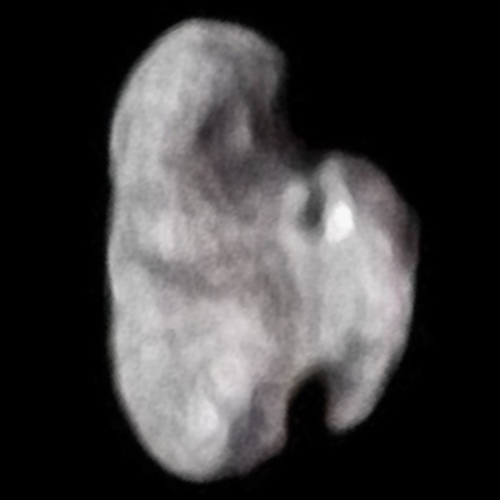
- Near true-color image of Hydra, taken by New Horizons on 14 July 2015

Discovery
- Discovered by: Hubble Space Telescope
- Discovery date: 15 May 2005

Designations
- Designation: Pluto III
- Pronunciation: /ˈhaɪdrə/
- Named after: Lernaean Hydra
- Alternative names: S/2005 P 1
- Adjectives: Hydrian /ˈhaɪdriən/

Orbital characteristics
- Semi-major axis: 64738±3 km
- Eccentricity: 0.005862±0.000025
- Orbital period (sidereal): 38.20177±0.00003 d
- Average orbital speed: 0.123 km/s
- Inclination: 0.242°±0.005°
- Satellite of: Pluto

Physical characteristics
- Dimensions: 50.9 km × 36.1 km × 30.9 km (Geometric mean of 38 km)
- Mass: (3.01±0.30)×10^{16} kg
- Mean density: 1.220±0.150 g/cm^{3}
- Surface gravity: 0.00520055269 g
- Synodic rotation period: 0.4295 d (10.31 h) (July 2015)
- Axial tilt: 110°
- Albedo: 0.83 ± 0.08 (geometric)
- Temperature: 23 K
- Apparent magnitude: 22.9–23.3 (measured)

Hydra, formal designation (134340) Pluto III, is a natural satellite of Pluto, with a diameter of approximately 51 km (32 mi) across its longest dimension. It is the second-largest moon of Pluto, being slightly larger than Nix. Hydra was discovered along with Nix by astronomers using the Hubble Space Telescope on 15 May 2005, and was named after the Hydra, the nine-headed underworld serpent in Greek mythology. By distance, Hydra is the fifth and outermost moon of Pluto, orbiting beyond Pluto's fourth moon Kerberos.

Hydra has a highly reflective surface caused by the presence of water ice, similar to other Plutonian moons. Hydra's reflectivity is intermediate, in between those of Pluto and Charon. The New Horizons spacecraft imaged Pluto and its moons in July 2015 and returned multiple images of Hydra.

== Discovery ==
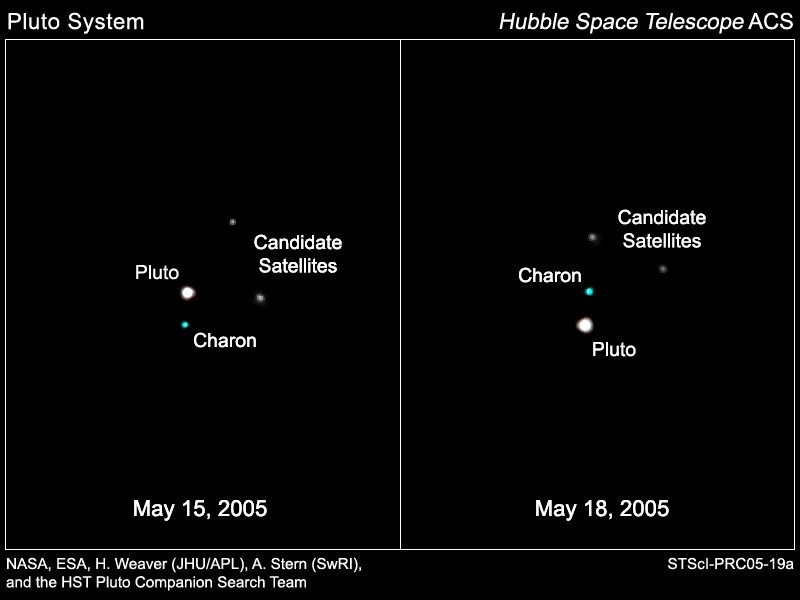
Discovery images of Nix and Hydra

Members of the New Horizons team suspected that Pluto and Charon might be accompanied by other small, distant moons, weakly bound to the Pluto system. They used the Hubble Space Telescope to test this hypothesis. This led to the discovery of Nix and Hydra – both surprisingly close to Pluto/Charon – and that no significant moons existed in Pluto's extended sphere of influence.

The discovery images were taken on 15 May 2005 and 18 May 2005. Hydra and Nix were independently discovered by Max J. Mutchler on 15 June 2005 and by Andrew J. Steffl on 15 August 2005. The discoveries were announced on 31 October 2005, after confirmation by precovering archival Hubble images of Pluto from 2002. The two newly discovered moons were subsequently provisionally designated S/2005 P 1 for Hydra and S/2005 P 2 for Nix. The moons were informally referred to as "P1" and "P2" respectively, by the discovery team.

== Naming ==
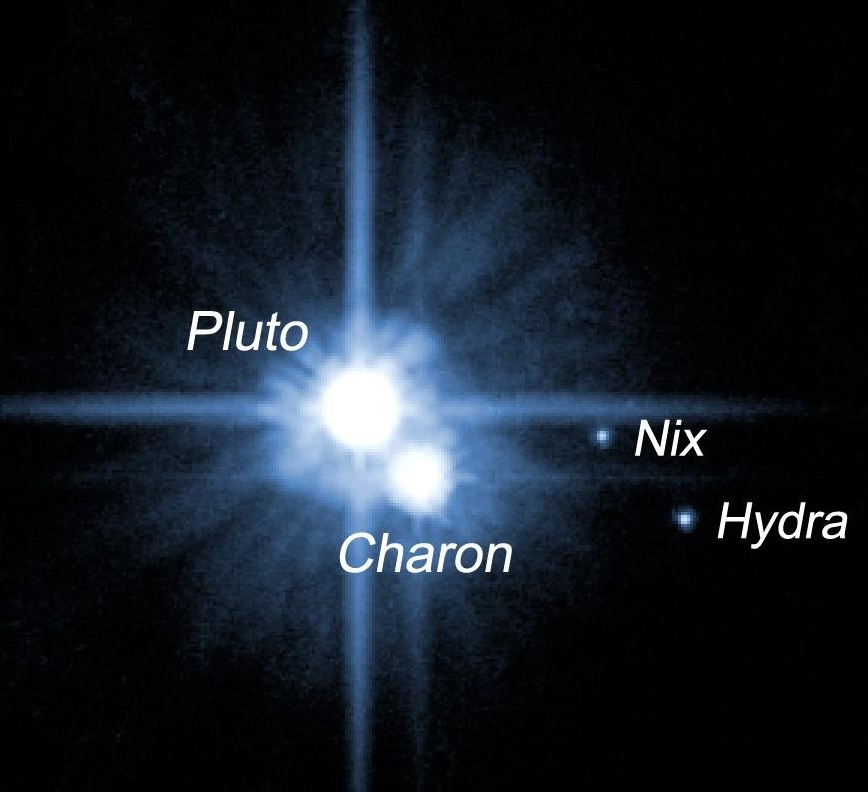
Hubble image of Pluto's moons (annotated)

The name Hydra was approved on 21 June 2006 by the International Astronomical Union (IAU) and was announced along with the naming of Nix in the IAU Circular 8723. Hydra was named after the Lernaean Hydra, a multi-headed serpent that battled Heracles/Hercules in Greek and Roman mythology. Particularly, the nine heads of Hydra subtly references Pluto's former ninth planetary status. The two newly named moons were intentionally named that the order of their initials N and H honors the New Horizons mission to Pluto, similarly to how the first two letters of Pluto's name honors Percival Lowell.

The names of features on the bodies in the Pluto system are related to mythology and the literature and history of exploration. In particular, the names of features on Hydra must be related to legendary serpents and dragons from literature, mythology, and history.

== Origin ==
Pluto's smaller moons, including Hydra, were thought to have formed from debris ejected from a massive collision between Pluto and another Kuiper belt object, similarly to how the Moon is believed to have formed from debris ejected by a large collision of Earth. The ejecta from the collision would then coalesce into the moons of Pluto. It was thought that Hydra had initially formed at a closer proximity to Pluto, and its orbit had undergone changes through tidal interactions. In this case, Hydra along with the smaller moons of Pluto would have migrated outwards with Charon into their current orbits around the Pluto–Charon barycenter. Through 'tidal damping' by mutual tidal interactions with Charon, Hydra's orbit around the Pluto–Charon barycenter gradually became more circular over time. Hydra is believed to have formed from two smaller objects merging into one single object.

== Physical characteristics ==
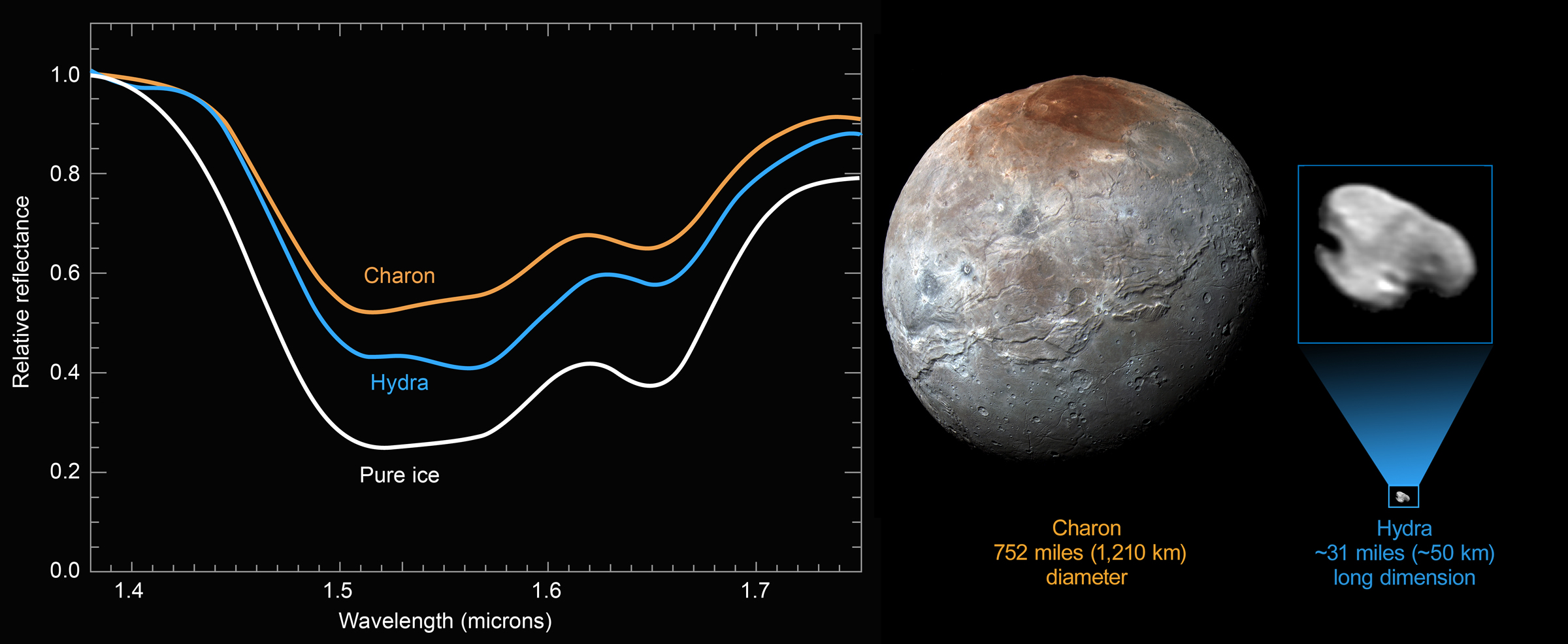
Spectra comparison of Hydra and Charon. Hydra's spectrum closely matches that of pure water ice, which is shown for comparison.

Hydra is irregular in shape, measuring 50.9 km (31.6 mi) along its longest axis and its shortest axis measuring 30.9 km (19.2 mi) across. This gives Hydra the measured dimensions of 50.9 km × 36.1 km × 30.9 km (31.6 mi × 22.4 mi × 19.2 mi).

The surface of Hydra is highly reflective due to the presence of water ice on its surface. The surface of Hydra displays a neutral spectrum similarly to Pluto's small moons, although the spectrum of Hydra appears slightly bluer. The water ice on Hydra's surface is relatively pure and shows no significant darkening compared to Charon. One explanation suggests that Hydra's surface is continually refreshed by micrometeorite impacts ejecting darker material from the surface of Hydra. The surface spectrum of Hydra is slightly bluish compared to that of Nix. Explanations for Hydra's bluish color suggest that the surface of Hydra has a higher amount of water ice compared to Nix, which could also explain Hydra's very high geometric albedo, or its reflectivity, of 83 percent.

Derived from crater counting data from New Horizons, the surface of Hydra is estimated to be about four billion years old. Large craters and indentations on Hydra suggest that it may have lost some of its original mass from impact events since its formation.

=== Rotation ===
Hydra is not tidally locked and rotates chaotically; its rotational period and axial tilt vary quickly over astronomical timescales, to the point that its rotational axis regularly flips over. Hydra's chaotic tumbling, or rotation is largely caused by the varying gravitational influences of Pluto and Charon as they orbit around their barycenter. Hydra's chaotic tumbling is also strengthened by its irregular shape, which creates torques that act on the object. At the time of the New Horizons flyby of Pluto and its moons, Hydra's rotation period was approximately 10 hours and its rotational axis was tilted about 110 degrees to its orbit — it was rotating sideways at the time of the New Horizons flyby.

Hydra rotates relatively quickly compared to the rest of Pluto's moons, which all have rotation periods greater than one day. This rapid rotation of Hydra is common among the rotation periods of most Kuiper belt objects. Hydra's surface material could get ejected due to centrifugal forces if it were rotating at a faster rate.

== Orbit ==
Animation of moons of Pluto around the barycenter of Pluto – Ecliptic plane

Front view

Side view

Pluto · Charon · Styx · Nix · Kerberos · Hydra

Hydra orbits the Pluto–Charon barycenter at a distance of 64,738 km (40,226 mi). Hydra is the outermost moon of Pluto, orbiting beyond Kerberos. Similarly to all of Pluto's moons, Hydra's orbit is nearly circular and is coplanar to Charon's orbit; all of Pluto's moons have very low orbital inclinations to Pluto's equator.

The nearly circular and coplanar orbits of Pluto's moons suggest that they may have gone through tidal evolutions since their formation. At the time of the formation of Pluto's smaller moons, Hydra may have had a more eccentric orbit around the Pluto–Charon barycenter. The present circular orbit of Hydra may have been caused by Charon's tidal damping of the eccentricity of Hydra's orbit, through tidal interactions. The mutual tidal interactions of Charon on Hydra's orbit would cause Hydra to transfer its orbital eccentricity to Charon, thus causing the orbit of Hydra to gradually become more circular over time.

Hydra's orbit is close to a 1:6 orbital resonance with Charon, with a timing discrepancy of 0.3%. A hypothesis explaining the near-resonance suggests that the resonance originated before the outward migration of Charon after the formation of all five known moons, and is maintained by the periodic local fluctuation of 5% in the Pluto–Charon gravitational field strength. (Note: The instantaneous force at Hydra's distance in the Pluto–Charon–Hydra alignment case is 4.62% larger than in the quadrature case (where Hydra is 90° from the Pluto–Charon axis); the Charon–Pluto–Hydra case is almost exactly halfway between those values. In Buie et al., the quote is "The gravitational force exerted by Pluto on either P1 or P2 varies by roughly 15% (peak-to-peak)." Pluto's gravitational pull, by itself, varies by 18% for Nix and 13% for Hydra.)

== Exploration ==
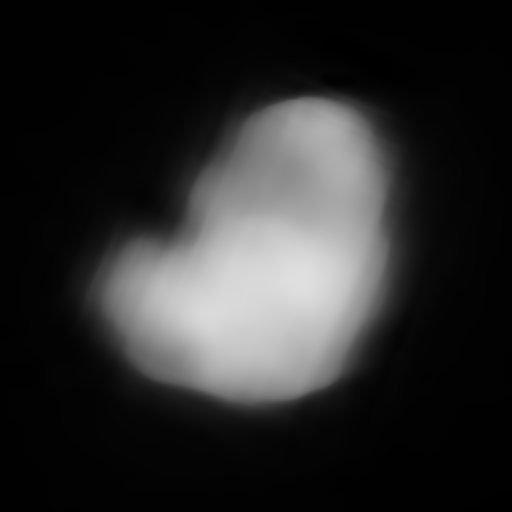
Hydra imaged from a distance of 640,000 km (400,000 mi)

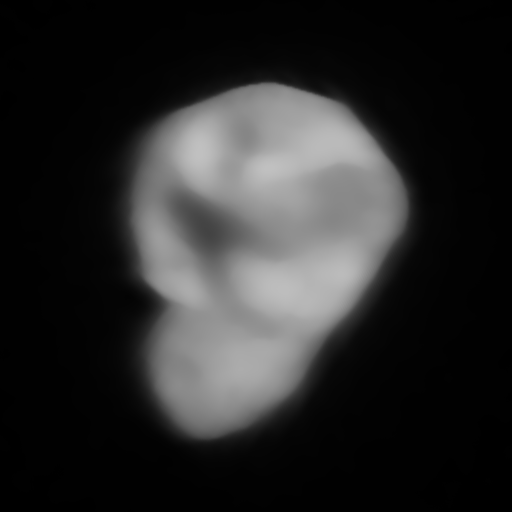
Hydra imaged from a distance of 360,000 km (220,000 mi)

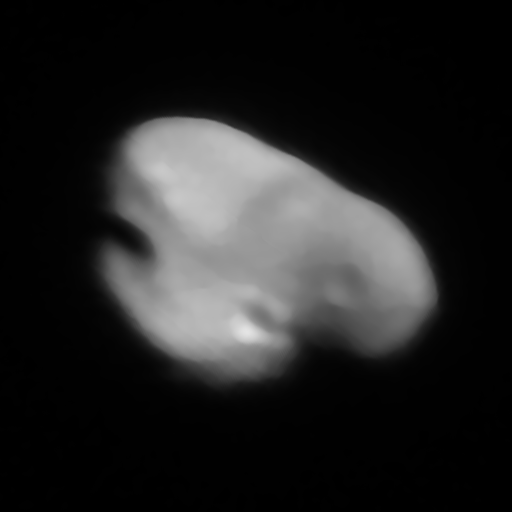
Hydra imaged from a distance of 230,000 km (140,000 mi)

The New Horizons spacecraft visited the Pluto system and imaged Pluto and its moons during its flyby on 14 July 2015. At the time of the New Horizons flyby, Hydra was behind Pluto and was further away from New Horizons at closest approach. The larger distance of Hydra from New Horizons resulted in lower resolution images of Hydra. Before the flyby, the Long Range Reconnaissance Imager on board New Horizons performed measurements of Hydra's size, estimating Hydra to be about 45 km (28 mi) in diameter. Hydra's surface composition, reflectivity, and other basic physical properties were later measured by New Horizons during the flyby.

The first detailed image of Hydra was downlinked, or received from the New Horizons spacecraft on 15 July 2015 after the flyby. The first detailed image of Hydra, taken from a distance of 640,000 km (400,000 mi), appeared to show brightness variations and a dark circular feature 10 km (6.2 mi) across. The highest resolution images of Hydra were taken from a distance of 231,000 km (144,000 mi), with an image resolution of 1.2 km (0.75 mi) per pixel. Derived from those images, Hydra was given the approximate size estimate of 55 km × 40 km (34 mi × 25 mi).

== See also ==
- List of natural satellites
