= Daniel Sarokon =

NASA Launch Conductor

Daniel Sarokon (January 27, 1927 - January 1, 2006) was a NASA Launch Conductor, described as 'one of the most influential people in the history of space travel. His first launch was that of the Moon probe Surveyor 1 and in his career he supervised 30 lunar and planetary missions.

The launch of the New Horizons Pluto mission in January 2006 was dedicated in his honour.

== See also ==
- List of New Horizons topics
