= Organa (crater) =

Crater on Charon

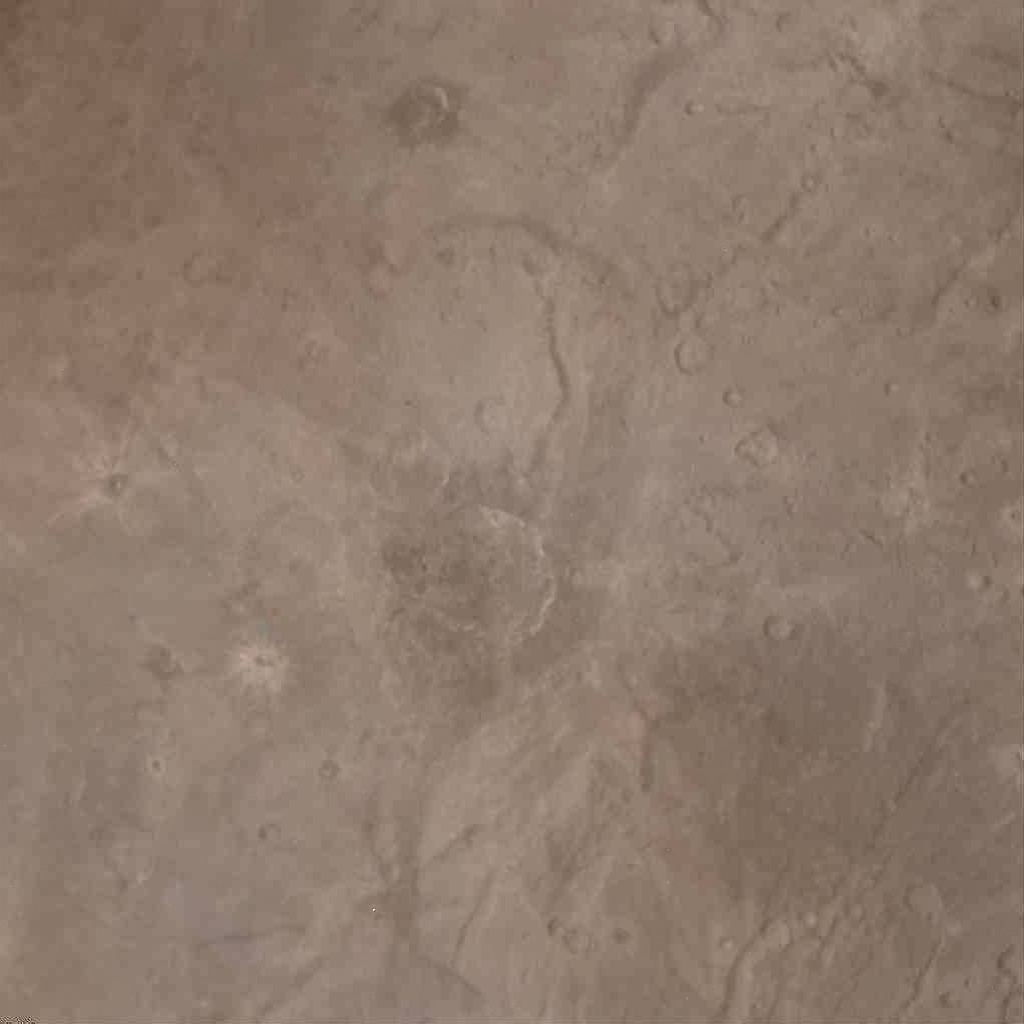
- Photo of Charon centered on Ripley Crater. Nostromo Chasma crosses Ripley vertically. Organa Crater is at 9:00, and Vader is the dark crater at 12:00
- Feature type: Impact crater
- Location: Charon
- Coordinates: 55°N 50°W
- Diameter: 5 kilometres (3.1 mi)
- Discoverer: New Horizons
- Naming: Unofficial
- Eponym: Leia Organa

Organa is the informal name given to a crater on Pluto's largest moon, Charon. The crater was discovered by NASA's New Horizons space probe on its flyby of Pluto. The name was chosen as a reference to Leia Organa from the Star Wars media franchise, which keeps with the theme of naming Charon's craters after science fiction characters. Organa crater is rich in frozen ammonia, which suggests it was created very recently. This crater is located in the northern Pluto-facing hemisphere of Charon.

== Ammonia ==
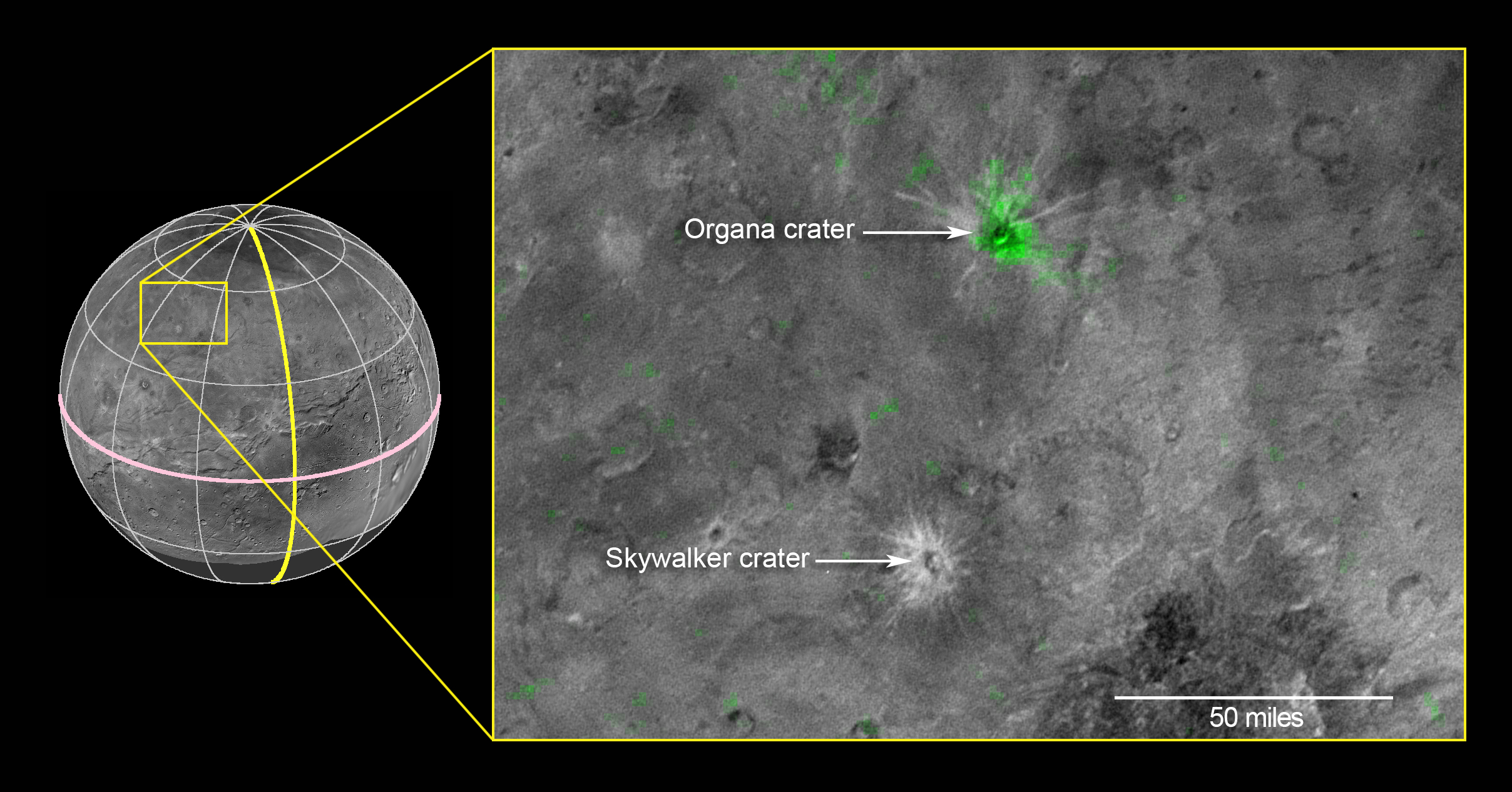
A composite image showing the ammonia around Organa crater, in green.

Organa crater is the only known crater on Charon that contains abundant ammonia. The ammonia was detected using the New Horizons LEISA instrument, by observing an absorption of infrared light in the 2.22 μm band, which is associated with ammonia.

The source of the ammonia has not been confirmed, but it is associated with the impact process that created Organa crater, perhaps by removing the overlaying layer of water of ice and regolith. If this is confirmed, the detection could indicate that Charon has experienced cryovolcanic activity, with ammonia as magma. This interpretation is puzzling, since cryovolcanism is not known to occur on such small bodies. In this scenario, the ammonia may have precipitated from an atmosphere, or soaked the ground from a subsurface source, or diffused out of the existing tholin.

An alternate explanation suggests the deposit of ammonia was delivered by the impactor that created Organa crater. In either case, it is believed that Organa crater is the result of a recent impact, less than 10 million years ago. The impact that created Organa crater may have been so recent that the ammonia has not yet been destroyed by radiation from space.

== See also ==
- List of geological features on Charon
