= 2011 KW48 =

Large Kuiper belt object observed by New Horizons

2011 KW_{48}
Discovery
- Discovered by: New Horizons KBO Search (266)
- Discovery site: Subaru Telescope
- Discovery date: 29 May 2011 (discovery: first observed only)

Designations
- Alternative designations: VNH0004
- Minor planet category: TNO · inner classic distant

Orbital characteristics
- Epoch 8 June 2011 (JD 2455720.5)
- Uncertainty parameter n.a.
- Observation arc: 34 days
- Aphelion: 42.676 AU
- Perihelion: 32.368 AU
- Semi-major axis: 37.522 AU
- Eccentricity: 0.1374
- Orbital period (sidereal): 229.84 yr (83,950 days)
- Mean anomaly: 347.91°
- Mean motion: 0° 0^{m} 15.48^{s} / day
- Inclination: 3.6328°
- Longitude of ascending node: 246.15°
- Argument of perihelion: 46.931°

Physical characteristics
- Mean diameter: 77 km
- Geometric albedo: 0.09 (estimate)
- Absolute magnitude (H): 8.8

2011 KW_{48} is a trans-Neptunian object from the inner classical part of the Kuiper belt, located in the outermost region of the Solar System. It measures approximately 77 kilometers (48 mi) in diameter.

The object was first observed on 29 May 2011, during the New Horizons KBO Search (266) conducted by astronomers using the Subaru Telescope at the Mauna Kea Observatory on Hawaii, United States. It was later observed by the New Horizons space probe from afar in January 2015.

== Orbit and classification ==
2011 KW_{48} orbits the Sun at a distance of 32.4–42.7 AU once every 229 years and 10 months (83,950 days; semi-major axis of 37.5 AU). Its orbit has an eccentricity of 0.14 and an inclination of 3.6° with respect to the ecliptic.

This object was observed 12 times by the Mauna Kea (8) and Las Campanas (4) observatories over a period of about 33.8 days between 29 May and 2 July 2011. Because of this short period of observation, its current orbit is extremely uncertain.

== New Horizons ==
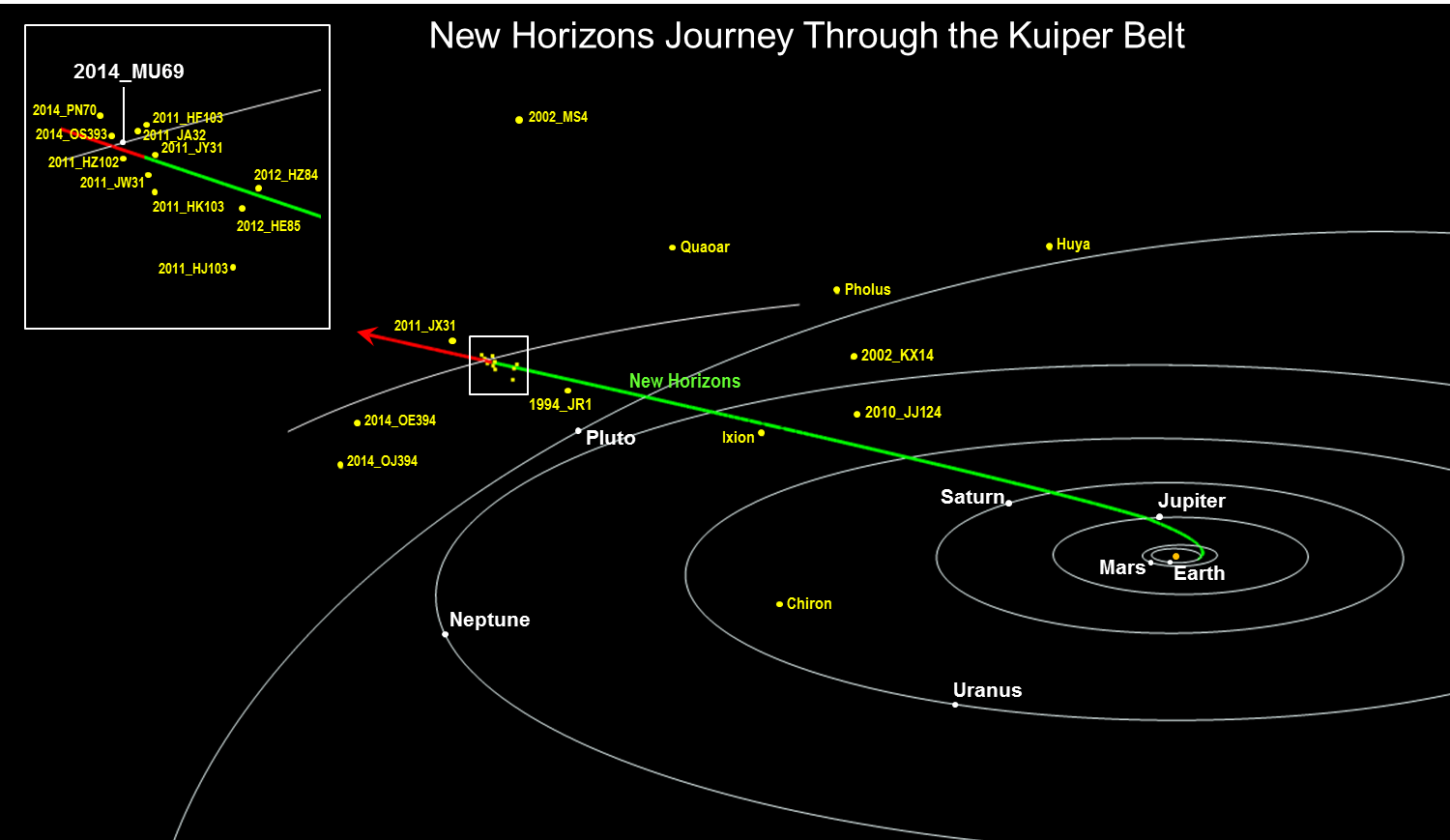
Trajectory of New Horizons and other nearby Kuiper belt objects

Between 4–15 January 2015, the New Horizons spacecraft actively observed this object – then temporarily designated VNH0004 – at a distance of about 0.5 AU (75 million km; 46 million mi). While this was too far to resolve surface features or perform spectroscopic analyses of its composition, the spacecraft was able to search for possible satellites and observe its phase curve.

== Physical characteristics ==
Based on an absolute magnitude of 8.8, and an assumed albedo of 0.09, Johnston's Archive estimates a mean diameter of approximately 77 kilometers (48 mi). As of 2018, no rotational lightcurve of 2011 KW_{48} has been obtained from photometric observations. The object's rotation period, pole and shape remain unknown.

== Numbering and naming ==
As of 2025, this minor planet has not been numbered or named.

== See also ==
- List of New Horizons topics
